= Immovable Cultural Heritage in the Bor District =

This list includes Immovable Cultural Heritage sites in the Bor District of Serbia.

== Cultural Monuments ==
Number in the Central Register	Photo	Name	Municipality	Address	Designated since	Classification
SK 215		Koroglaš Monastery	Negotin	Miloševo; 44.259938°N 22.52787°E	20 March 1948	Great Importance
SK 223		Hajduk Veljko's Powder Magazine	Negotin	Negotin; Hajduk Veljkova St. 44.226862°N 22.531339°E	13 March 1950	Exceptional Importance
SK 243		Old church of the Holy Mother of God	Negotin	Negotin; 44.225812°N 22.540407°E	18 June 1980	Great Importance
SK 284		Fetislam Fortress	Kladovo	Kladovo; 44.615492°N 22.602286°E	27 October 1964	Great Importance
SK 286		Church of the Holy Trinity	Kladovo	Brza Palanka; 44.483471°N 22.452749°E	28 June 1967	
SK 299		Cathedral Church of the Holy Trinity	Negotin	Negotin; 44.22675°N 22.531294°E	2 June 1967	
SK 300		Church of the Ascension of the Lord	Negotin	Jabukovac; 44.3484°N 22.385324°E	28 June 1967	
SK 310		Stevan Mokranjac's House	Negotin	Negotin; Dositejeva 7; 44.225768°N 22.530427°E	15 October 1975	Great Importance
SK 314		Wooden church	Negotin	Brestovac; 44.183835°N 22.404936°E	28 December 1976	
SK 315		Wooden Church	Negotin	Popovica; 4.222537°N 22.282155°E	28 December 1976	
SK 316		Wooden Church	Negotin	Trnjane; 44.220031°N 22.357389°E	28 December 1976	
SK 319		Bukovo monastery	Negotin	Bukovo; 44.215694°N 22.492487°E	18 June 1980	
SK 327		Residence of Prince Miloš	Bor	Brestovačka Banja; 44.060154°N 22.044064°E	22 July 1949	
SK 328		Prince's castle	Bor	Brestovačka Banja; 44.060204°N 22.043587°E	22 July 1949	
SK 334		Monument to Hajduk Veljko Petrović	Negotin	Negotin; Trg Stevana Mokranjca; 44.22652°N 22.53051°E	7 September 1976	
SK 335		Museum of Krajina Building	Negotin	Negotin; Vere Radosavljević 1; 44.224782°N 22.531381°E	18 June 1980	
SK 336		Pedagogical Academy Building	Negotin	Negotin; Trg Đorđa Stanojevića; 44.22961°N 22.529809°E	18 June 1980	
SK 337		Youth Center "Stanko Paunović" Building	Negotin	Negotin; Badnjevska 5; 44.232981°N 22.526446°E	18 June 1980	
SK 338		Old Fountains Complex	Negotin	Vidrovac; 44.267376°N 22.491271°E	18 June 1980	
SK 339		JNA (Yougoslav People's Army) Club Building	Negotin	Negotin; Corner of Ljube Nešića St and Dobrile Radosavljević St; 44.224726°N 22.53199°E	3 July 1980	
SK 340		Village house with "jazluk"	Negotin	Brestovac; 44.185405°N 22.403695°E	3 July 1980	
SK 341		Đokinska Watermill	Negotin	Brestovac; 44.185358°N 22.403952°E	3 July 1980	
SK 342		Old Village Cemetery	Negotin	Rajac; 44.095612°N 22.547912°E	3 July 1980	Exceptional Importance
SK 343		Old Village Cemetery	Negotin	Rogljevo; 44.119604°N 22.566365°E	3 July 1980	
SK 459		Partisan Momčilo Ranković's House	Negotin	Rajac; 44.093981°N 22.558061°E	7 October 1981	
SK 460		Old Civic House	Negotin	Negotin; Dobrile Radosavljević 2; 44.225059°N 22.534095°E	3 July 1980	
SK 465		House of the People's Hero Stanko Paunović	Negotin	Brestovac; 44.185343°N 22.403716°E	10 October 1975	
SK 475		Old Post Office Building - Mezulana	Kladovo	Brza Palanka; 44.466805°N 22.450119°E	9 July 1979	
SK 609		Tabula Traiana	Kladovo	Tekija; 44.650879°N 22.303972°E	22 November 1949	Exceptional Importance
SK 873		Faculty of Engineering Building	Bor	Bor; 44.081699°N 22.096228°E	31 December 1988	
SK 913		Monument to the Serbian and French Soldiers during 1912-1918.	Bor	Moše Pijade St. 44.075984°N 22.099484°E	29 December 1988	
SK 914		Monument to Petar Radovanović	Bor	Bor; 44.079395°N 22.098725°E	29 December 1988	
SK 915		Monument of Miklós Radnóti near Bor Lake	Bor	Bor; 44.055696°N 22.102418°E	29 December 1988	
SK 916		Memorial Huts "Partisan Camp"	Bor	Brusovo; 44.076947°N 22.098189°E	29 December 1988	
SK 945		Church of the Dormition of Holy Mother of God	Bor	Slatina; 44.040412°N 22.162137°E	28 December 1989	
SK 1468		Old Smelter in Majdanpek	Majdanpek	Majdanpek; 44.367919°N 21.907314°E	31 March 1983	Great Importance
SK 2054		Cultural Center Building in Bor	Bor	Moše Pijade 19; 44.074893°N 22.098929°E	29 December 1988	
SK 2070		Prince Miloš's Hammam (bath) in Brestovačka Banja	Bor	Brestovačka Banja; 44.060345°N 22.044062°E	22 July 1949	
SK 2088		Office Building at Oslobođenja Square no. 5 in Bor	Bor	Trg oslobođenja 5; 44.077897°N 22.099191°E	29 December 1988	
SK 2089		"Pena" Signal Station on Đerdap	Kladovo	Tekija; 44.618715°N 22.27421°E	28 April 1994	

== Archaeological Sites ==
Number in the Central Register	Photo	Name	Municipality	Address	Designated since	Classification
AN 23		Lazareva Cave	Bor	Zlot; 44.029445°N 21.962424°E	4 September 1948	
AN 38		Mokranjske Stene	Negotin	Mokranje; 44.163245°N 22.526499°E	3 July 1980	
AN 39		Rudna Glava Archaeological Site	Majdanpek	Rudna Glava; 44.339494°N 22.087591°E	24 June 1981	Exceptional Importance
AN 44		Pontes with Trajan's Bridge	Kladovo	Kladovo; 44.613206°N 22.669130°E	28 March 1981	Exceptional Importance
AN 45		Lepenski Vir	Majdanpek	Boljetin; 44.556867°N 22.026450°E	26 May 1966	Exceptional Importance
AN 53		Ravna Archaeological Site	Majdanpek	Boljetin	26 May 1966	
AN 54		Hajdučka vodenica	Kladovo	Kladovo; 44.638517°N 22.303292°E	25 May 1966	
AN 55		Veliki Gradac and Banja Archaeological Site	Majdanpek	Donji Milanovac	25 May 1966	
AN 56		Golo Brdo Archaeological Site	Kladovo	Kladovo	27 May 1966	
AN 57		Mala Livadica Archaeological Site	Majdanpek	Boljetin	27 May 1966	
AN 58		Velika Livadica Archaeological Site	Majdanpek	Boljetin	27 May 1966	
AN 60		Transdierna	Kladovo	Tekija	25 May 1966	
AN 61		Kastrum Archaeological Site	Kladovo	Novi Sip	25 May 1966	
AN 62		Ribnica Archaeological Site	Majdanpek	Donji Milanovac	25 May 1966	
AN 63		Pecka Bara Archaeological Site	Kladovo	Kladovo	25 May 1966	
AN 64		Ciganija Archaeological Site	Majdanpek	Donji Milanovac	25 May 1966	
AN 65		Malo Golubinje Archaeological Site	Kladovo	Malo Golubinje	25 May 1966	
AN 66		Veliko Golubinje Archaeological Site	Kladovo	Veliko Golubinje	25 May 1966	
AN 67		Boljetinska Reka Archaeological Site	Majdanpek	Boljetin	26 May 1966	
AN 92		Trnjana Archaeological Site	Bor	Brestovačka Banja; 44.070100°N 22.048257°E	29 December 1988	
AN 93		Kučajna Archaeological Site	Bor	Bor; 44.059398°N 22.090029°E	29 December 1988	
AN 94		Kastel Archaeological Site	Majdanpek	Miroč; 44.475511°N 22.251006°E	8 October 1986	
AN 103		Diana Karataš Roman and Byzantine Fortress	Kladovo	Novi Sip; 44.653590°N 22.544301°E	9 July 1979	Exceptional Importance
AN 150		Vrelo Archaeological Site	Negotin	Šarkamen; 44.261868°N 22.296264°E	8 August 1997	
AN 161		Kmpije - Velike Livade	Bor	Bor; 44.064393°N 22.106895°E	10 May 2012	
AN 162		Vajuga Archaeological Site	Kladovo	Vajuga; 44.548736°N 22.647551°E	10 May 2012	
AN 166		Milutinovac Archaeological Site	Kladovo	Milutinovac; 44.549829°N 22.573466°E	18 May 2012	

== Historic Landmarks ==
Number in the Central Register	Photo	Name	Municipality	Address	Designated since	Classification
ZM 11		Memorial Hall and Memorial Museum at Stevanske livade	Negotin	Sikole	7 September 1976	

== Spatial Cultural-Historical Units ==
Number in the Central Register	Photo	Name	Municipality	Address	Designated since	Classification
PKIC 10		Štubik Wine Cellars Complex	Negotin	Štubik; 44.226084°N 22.474123°E	8 June 1980	Exceptional Importance
PKIC 12		Old downtown	Negotin	Negotin; 44.227639°N 22.530828°E	3 July 1980	Great Importance
PKIC 13		Mokranjac House Complex	Negotin	Negotin; 44.225425°N 22.530565°E	18 June 1980	
PKIC 14		Rajac and Rogljevo Wine Cellars Complex	Negotin	Rajac; 44.097268°N 22.550116°E	23 February 1983	Exceptional Importance
PKIC 32		Narrow Area of Brestovačka Banja	Bor	Brestovačka Banja; 44.060154°N 22.044064°E	10 October 1991	
PKIC 34		M. Tita Street	Kladovo	Kladovo; M. Tita St. (Kralja Aleksandra St.); 44.611332°N 22.609484°E	31 January 1986	

== See also ==
- Immovable Cultural Heritage of Exceptional Importance (Serbia)
- Immovable Cultural Heritage of Great Importance (Serbia)
