= State Road 33 (Serbia) =

Road in Serbia

State Road 33
- Serbian: Državni put IB reda 33; Serbian Cyrillic: Државни пут IБ реда 33

Route information
- Maintained by JP "Putevi Srbije"
- Length: 203.988 km (126.752 mi)

Major junctions
- From: Ralja E75
- To: Serbia-Bulgaria border at Mokranje

Location
- Country: Serbia
- Districts: Podunavlje, Braničevo, Bor

Highway system
- Roads in Serbia; Motorways
← 32	→ 34

State Road 33 is an IB-class road in eastern Serbia, connecting Ralja with Bulgaria at Mokranje. It is located in Southern and Eastern Serbia.

Before the new road categorization regulation given in 2013, the route wore the following names: P 109б, M 24, M 25 and P 278 (before 2012) / 22 (after 2012).

The existing route is a main road with two traffic lanes. By the valid Space Plan of Republic of Serbia the road is not planned for upgrading to motorway, and is expected to be conditioned in its current state.

== Sections ==
Section number	Length	Distance	Section name
03301	0.647 km (0.402 mi)	0.647 km (0.402 mi)	Požarevac interchange - Ralja
03302	1.357 km (0.843 mi)	2.004 km (1.245 mi)	Ralja - Mala Krsna
03303	11.075 km (6.882 mi)	13.079 km (8.127 mi)	Mala Krsna - Požarevac (bypass)
03304	1.495 km (0.929 mi)	14.574 km (9.056 mi)	Požarevac (bypass) - Požarevac (Osipaonica)
03305	2.197 km (1.365 mi)	16.771 km (10.421 mi)	Požarevac (Osipaonica) - Požarevac (Aleksandrovac)
03306	2.912 km (1.809 mi)	19.683 km (12.230 mi)	Požarevac (Aleksandrovac) - Požarevac (Orljevo)
03307	5.290 km (3.287 mi)	24.973 km (15.518 mi)	Požarevac (Orljevo) - Salakovac
03308	14.252 km (8.856 mi)	39.225 km (24.373 mi)	Salakovac - Zabrega (Boževac)
03309	4.912 km (3.052 mi)	44.137 km (27.425 mi)	Zabrega (Boževac) - Makce
03310	10.903 km (6.775 mi)	55.040 km (34.200 mi)	Makce - Lješnica
03311	6.066 km (3.769 mi)	61.106 km (37.970 mi)	Lješnica - Turija
03312	8.143 km (5.060 mi)	69.249 km (43.029 mi)	Turija - Kučevo
03313	40.938 km (25.438 mi)	110.187 km (68.467 mi)	Kučevo - Debeli Lug
03314	8.676 km (5.391 mi)	118.863 km (73.858 mi)	Debeli Lug - Majdanpek
03315	25.192 km (15.654 mi)	114.055 km (70.870 mi)	Majdanpek - Miloševa Kula
03316	7.272 km (4.519 mi)	151.327 km (94.030 mi)	Miloševa Kula - Klokočevac
03317	11.110 km (6.903 mi)	162.437 km (100.934 mi)	Klokočevac - Plavna
03318	7.905 km (4.912 mi)	170.342 km (105.846 mi)	Plavna - Štubik
03319	14.879 km (9.245 mi)	185.221 km (115.091 mi)	Štubik - Bukovo
03508	3.370 km (2.094 mi)	188.591 km (117.185 mi)	Bukovo - Negotin (entrance) (overlap with)
03320	1.349 km (0.838 mi)	188.940 km (117.402 mi)	Negotin (entrance) - Negotin (Brusnik)
03321	0.795 km (0.494 mi)	190.735 km (118.517 mi)	Negotin (Brusnik) - Negotin (Radujevac)
03322	11.027 km (6.852 mi)	201.762 km (125.369 mi)	Negotin (Radujevac) - Veljkovo
03323	2.226 km (1.383 mi)	203.988 km (126.752 mi)	Veljkovo - Serbia-Bulgaria border (Mokranje)

== See also ==
- Roads in Serbia
