= Zamna =

Zаmna Зaмна

Location
- Country: Serbia

Physical characteristics
- Source
  - location: Deli Jovan, Serbia
  - elevation: 1,039 m (3,409 ft)
- Mouth
  - location: Danube at Mihajlovac, Serbia
  - coordinates: 44.36821°N 22.48978°E
  - elevation: 44 m (144 ft)
- Length: 41 km (25 mi)
- Basin size: 207.66 km^{2} (80.18 sq mi)

Basin features
- Progression: Danube→ Black Sea

Zamna (Serbian: Замна) is a 41-kilometre-long (25-mile) river in eastern Serbia, the right tributary to the Danube. Its valley is known for the caves, arches and a canyon. It is also locally known as Zemna.

== Course and geography ==
Zamna originates on the eastern slopes of the Deli Jovan mountain, below the Crni Vrh, at an altitude of 1,039 m (3,409 ft). It originally flows in an easterly direction. At the village of Plavna, it receives the river Medveđa (also known as Medvedica) from the left. At the mouth, the river formed prerast, or natural arch. Obscured by the thick forest, it is called Rajski prerast ("Paradise Arch") and is 2.5 km (1.6 mi) away from the center of the village. Cave arches are formed when the porous, limestone ceiling of the cave collapses. Zamna's "Paradise Arch" is the tallest rocky arch in Europe.

Austrian traveler Felix Philipp Kanitz visited the area in the second half of the 19th century. He described the Deli Jovan mountain as rising above the river in four terraces, and the local tree flora which at the time included beech, oak, walnut and hazel. The area was properly explored for the first time in 1895 by the geographer Jovan Cvijić. He gave scientific explanations for the creation of the arches.

The cave was formed by the river, which also in time caused ceiling's collapses on two locations. These roof openings are called vigledi. The cave is actually one, continuous cave tunnel. It is 155 m (509 ft) long. Entry section is 18 m (59 ft) tall and 10 m (33 ft) wide. while the ending cavity is 10 m (33 ft) and 14 m (46 ft) wide. As the holes in the collapsed ceiling are 70 m (230 ft) apart, the tunnel is completely lit with daylight. The cave itself is still not being formed into the full arch, but it is slowly being morphed into it.

Apart from the arch, in the Plavna section the river also carved a steep 4-kilometre-long (2-mile) canyon, a typical for the Tithonian limestone region. The canyon is carved in the Deli Jovan's Kum massif. There are also two caves in this section: Dudić Cave and Cvetko Cave. Paradise Arch is located at the end of the canyon. The arch is almost 20 m (66 ft) tall and 4 to 12 m (13 to 39 ft) wide. Above the arch is a natural lookout. In total, there are over 10 caves, including the still unexplored Medved caves. Dudić Cave is 2 km (1.2 mi) long and rich in speleothems. However, in the wider valley of the river, there are 23 discovered caves so far, including Vasiljev and Novaković caves. The well arranged hiking path leads to the Dudić and Cvetko caves, though it is 6 km (3.7 mi) long and includes passing through water is some sections.

At the village of Štubik, it turns in the northeast direction and receives the Miljakovačka reka from the right and Turija from the left. Passing west of the village of Malajnica and east of the village of Jabukovac, it receives the Skočka river from the left. In lower section, the river meanders a lot, before it empties into the Danube at Mihajlovac, across the island of Ostrovu Mare.

At Jabukovac, there is a former riverbed of the Zamna. It is some 100 m (330 ft) long and abundant in fish.

== Wildlife ==
Lush forests consist of beech, common hornbeam, Turkey oak, ferns and moss. Arable land is mostly cultivated by the maize.

The river is rich in fish, including European chub, trout, gudgeon and common barbel. Crayfish also dwell in Zamna.

The valley of Zamna is also abundant in snakes. It is a habitat for grass snake, Aesculapian snake, horned viper and European adder.

As the area is close to the protected area of Vratna, deer and wild boars can be seen along the Zamna, too, so as the birds of prey. Free range cattle farming is developed.

== Human history ==
Ancient Roman archaeological site Šarkamen is in the vicinity of the river.

In 1807, during the First Serbian Uprising, two battles were fought in the river's valley: Battle of Štubik and Battle of Malajnica.

=== Folklore ===
Local folklore considers it a magical location, a place where fairies converge to seduce passersby with their magical dance. Local population uses the water from below the arch for magical rituals. It is believed that the water which flows over the stones is magically clear. Also, there are numerous tales of hidden hajduks' treasure, so the gorge is dug through on several places. The inhabitants also believed that in the river lives the Water Spirit. Paradise Arch was specifically named that way, as the residents believe it is a place where souls directly enter heaven, and the locality where forces of good and multi-dimensional demons collide. Kanitz described people he met as very pious.

=== Watermills ===
Zamna was known for its watermills. Over a dozen of them existed on the river. They grinded the corn flower, from which the specific corn bread was baked, called malaj(ac). It gave name to the village of Malajnica next to which the river flows.

== Protection ==
The canyon was protected for the first time in 1957. This decision was suppressed in June 2020 with the new one, when under the name of the "Tunnel Cave Arch in Zamna Canyon", the feature was protected as the natural monument. Described as the "speleological object of the tunnel cave type", the area was placed in category I of protection because of the "international, national and outstanding importance", based on its "authenticity, representativeness, landscape attractiveness and preservation". Protected area covers 39.5 ha (98 acres) on territories of two villages, Štubik and Plavna. It is administered by the Tourist Organization of Negotin.
