= Aleksandrovac (disambiguation) =

Aleksandrovac is a city and municipality in Rasina District, Serbia.

Aleksandrovac may also refer to:

- Aleksandrovac (Babušnica), a village in the Babušnica municipality of Šumadija District, Serbia
- Aleksandrovac (Negotin), a village in the Negotin municipality of Bor District, Serbia
- Aleksandrovac (Vranje), a village in the Vranje municipality of Pčinja District, Serbia
- Aleksandrovac (Žabari), a village in the Žabari municipality of Braničevo District, Serbia
