= Irra Ariella Khi =

Technology entrepreneur and humanitarian founder

Irra Ariella Khi is a technology entrepreneur and humanitarian founder based in the United Kingdom. She is the co-founder and chief executive of Zamna, an aviation technology company focused on digital identity and border compliance, and the founder of Sunflower Relief, a humanitarian initiative supporting civilians in Ukraine following the Russian invasion of the country in 2022. She also serves on the Communities Committee of the Harpur Trust, an educational charity based in Bedfordshire.

== Humanitarian work ==
Following the Russian invasion of Ukraine in 2022, Khi founded Sunflower Relief, a humanitarian initiative focused on supporting civilians affected by the conflict. Sky News reported that the organisation raised funds and coordinated aid efforts from the United Kingdom, with an emphasis on delivering assistance to civilians in conflict-affected areas of Ukraine.

In an interview with TechCrunch, Khi described pausing aspects of her technology work in order to focus on humanitarian relief efforts, including fundraising and coordination with aid networks. Coverage highlighted the rapid formation of Sunflower Relief and its role in mobilising private donations and logistical support in response to the humanitarian crisis.

== Technology career ==
Khi is the co-founder and chief executive of Zamna, an aviation technology company working in the area of digital identity and compliance for airlines and border authorities. In 2023, WestJet expanded its use of Zamna's digital intelligence system to verify travel documents across its network, following a pilot that reduced manual document checks.

== Other activities ==
Khi serves on the Communities Committee of the Harpur Trust, an educational charity based in Bedfordshire, England.

== Recognition ==
In 2025, Khi was named on Computer Weekly's longlist of the Most Influential Women in UK Tech. In 2019, she was named one of Management Today's "35 Women Under 35", listed under VChain, Zamna's former name.
