= Dupljane =

Dupljane may refer to:

- Dupljane (Vladičin Han), a village in Serbia
- Dupljane (Negotin), a village in Serbia
