= Samarinovac (Negotin) =

Samarinovac Самариновац Sârmănovăț, Sămărinovăț
- Village
- Location within Serbia
- Country: Serbia
- District: Bor District
- Municipality: Negotin

Population (2002)
  - Total: 464
- Time zone: UTC+1 (CET)
  - Summer (DST): UTC+2 (CEST)

Samarinovac (Serbian: Самариновац; Romanian: Sârmănovăț or Sămărinovăț) is a village in the municipality of Negotin, Serbia. According to the 2002 census, the village has a population of 464 people.

== Name ==
Historical records refer to the settlement as Sumarin, and later as Sumarinovac or Sumarinovce, before evolving into its modern name, Samarinovac (located near Negotin). Etymologically, the toponym appears to derive from the Latin names Sanctus Marinus (Saint Marinus) or Sancta Marina (Saint Marina).

== Geography ==
Samarinovac is a compact-type rural settlement situated on the banks of the Dupljanska River—the left tributary of the Jasenička River Canal—at an elevation of 50 meters (164 ft). The village lies on both sides of the modern Negotin–Prahovo road, approximately 5.5 kilometers (3.4 mi) north of Negotin. Its total cadastral area covers 1,324 hectares (3,272 acres).

== History ==
It is classified as an old village. Since its inception, it has changed its location three times—from Cânepiște / Konoplјište, from where it was moved in the mid-18th century to Seliște / Selište, and subsequently to its present-day site. Alongside Seliște and the current cemetery, there is an Old Cemetery (Morminți Bătrâni) featuring stone monuments dating from the second half of the 18th century. The villagers were buried in this cemetery when the settlement was located at Seliște. The village also contains a site where a church stood in the mid-last century. The old log church dedicated to St. Sava the Sanctified was built in 1816 and stood until 1872.

The earliest historical record of Samarinovac dates back to 1530, when it was registered as a settlement of 56 houses, divided into Upper and Lower Samarinovac. The village is also mentioned in 1560, while in 1586 it had a total of 40 houses—15 in Upper and 25 in Lower Samarinovac. It was one of 492 villages in the Vidin Sanjak inhabited by Vlachs (florin payers) who enjoyed a privileged military status.

On the Austrian map Temeswarer Banat, the village is marked under the name Marinovaz. The earliest post-conquest census of 1718 mentions Sumarinovatz as an inhabited settlement with 4 subjects. According to the ecclesiastical census of 1723, the Samarinovac (parish located in the Krajina region and belonging to the Eparchy of Sebeș) had 35 houses, while in 1736, during the period of Austrian occupation, it had 50 houses. It is further recorded in the poll tax census of 1740/41 (77 inhabitants) and the cadastral census of 1741 (25 inhabitants).

In the autumn of 1836, a census of all churches and monasteries in the Principality of Serbia was conducted. The census records show that church services in Samarinovac, as well as in all other Vlach villages, were held in the Vlach language (Romanian), just as they had been earlier in the 18th century. A census of Vlachs in the Principality of Serbia was carried out in 1850, at which time Samarinovac had 68 houses and 329 inhabitants, all of whom spoke Vlach (Romanian).

On 27 September 2007, in Samarinovac, a Romanian wayside cross was erected on land belonging to the family of Vlach activist Dușan Pârvulovici, who donated the terrain for this purpose. It was consecrated by Vlach priest Bojan Aleksandrović of the Romanian Orthodox Church's Diocese of Dacia Felix together with priests from Isacova in Moldova and Timișoara in Romania. A festival of Romanian culture and religion has been organized at the cross' site several times since. Vlach activist and CNMNR member Tihan Matasarevici stated to newspaper Jurnal Românesc: "It is good that we have such a cross, where we can pray in Romanian. These Christian Romanian symbols must be preserved and cared for with sanctity!" The inauguration event was attended by leaders of Romanian organizations of eastern Serbia and representatives of the Romanian embassy in Belgrade and the Parliament of Romania, with the cross having intended to be the cornerstone of a new Romanian church in Samarinovac.

== Demographics and culture ==
Ethnic composition before World War II

1850. (Vlachs)		1866. (Vlachs)				1921. (Romanians)			
Houses	Souls	Total	Serbs	Vlachs	% Vl.	Total	Serbs	Romanians	% Rom.
68	329	403	0	391	97.02	721	88	638	88.49

The population is predominantly Eastern Orthodox, celebrating various family patron saints (slavas) such as Petkovica, Nikoljdan, Aranđelovdan, and Đurđic, alongside community votive days (zavetine) on Easter and Spasovdan (Ascension Day).

Ethnically and nationally, the population identifies mostly as Serb and Vlach, with many families having historically immigrated from the Wallachian Plain. Anthropogeographical and ethnological studies formally classify Samarinovac as a Vlach village. The local population is structurally farming-oriented, with 42.8% engaged in agrarian activities. The demographic aging index (i) has ranged from 0.5 in 1961 up to 1.2 in 1991.

== Infrastructure and economy ==
Water Supply: Primarily collective (serving 97.4% of households), supplemented by individual sources such as dug wells (1.3%) and public street fountains connected to a separate spring (0.8%).

Education: Features a four-grade elementary school (which recorded 14 pupils during the 2000/2001 academic year).

Administration: Includes a Local Community Office (MZ) and a Local Office (MK).

Settlement Layout: The village is informally divided into distinct neighborhood clusters bearing traditional clan names, such as the Jovanovići, Jonovići, and Marinovići.

== Notable people ==
- Jovan Mišković (Negotin, 18 July 1844 – Belgrade, 2 November 1908) was a Serbian general, Minister of Defence, military theorist, writer and the president of Serbian academy of sciences and arts.
