= Kobišnica =

Kobišnica Cobișnița
- Village
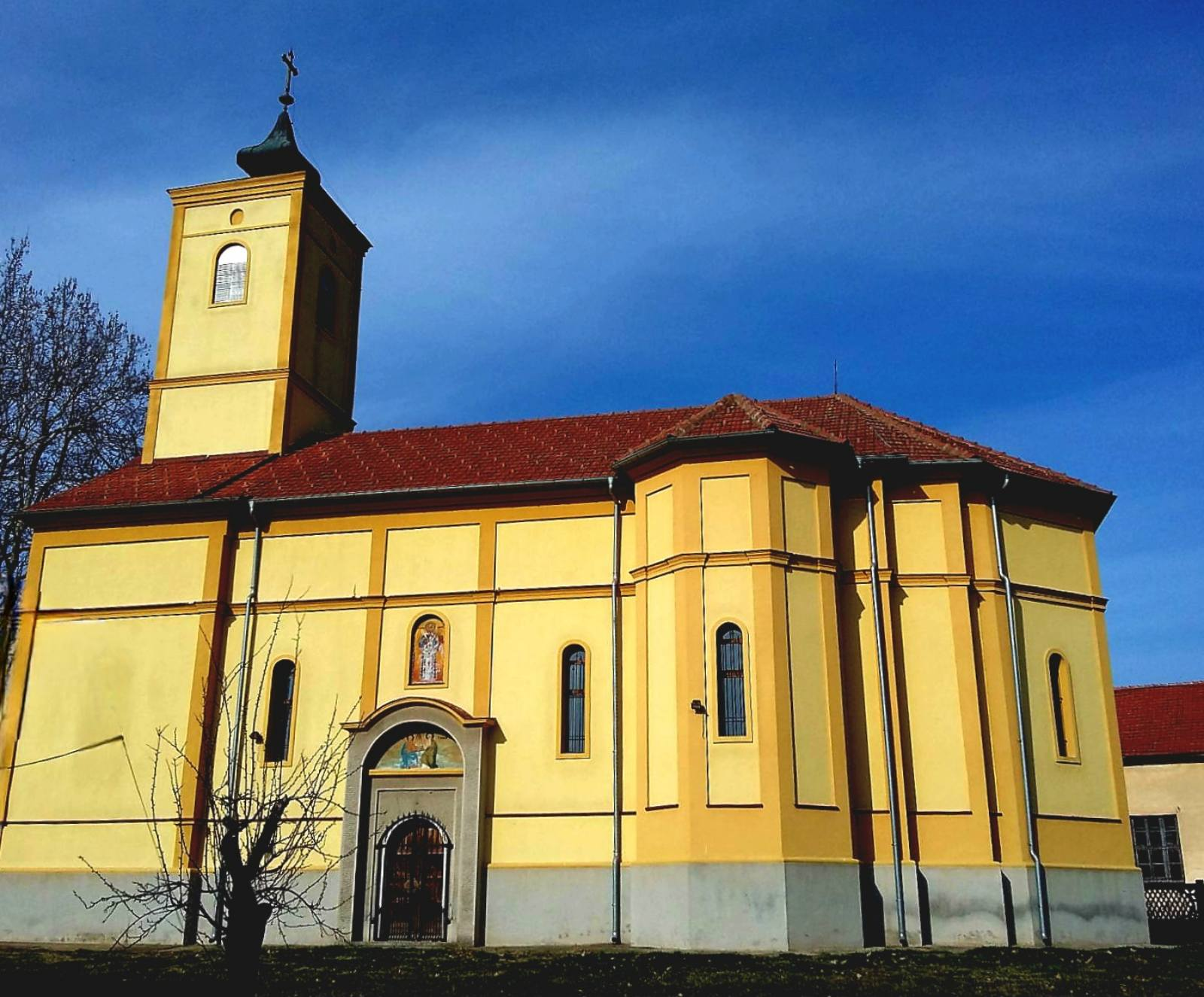

- Location within Serbia
- Coordinates: 44°11′37″N 22°35′42″E
- Country: Serbia
- District: Bor District
- Municipality: Negotin

Population (2002)
  - Total: 1,355
- Time zone: UTC+1 (CET)
  - Summer (DST): UTC+2 (CEST)

Kobišnica (Romanian: Cobișnița) is a village in the municipality of Negotin, Serbia. According to the 2002 census, the village has a population of 1355 people.

== Notable people ==
- Adam Puslojić (1943–2022), poet, translator and writer
