= Ana Šomlo =

Serbian-Israeli writer and journalist (1935–2024)

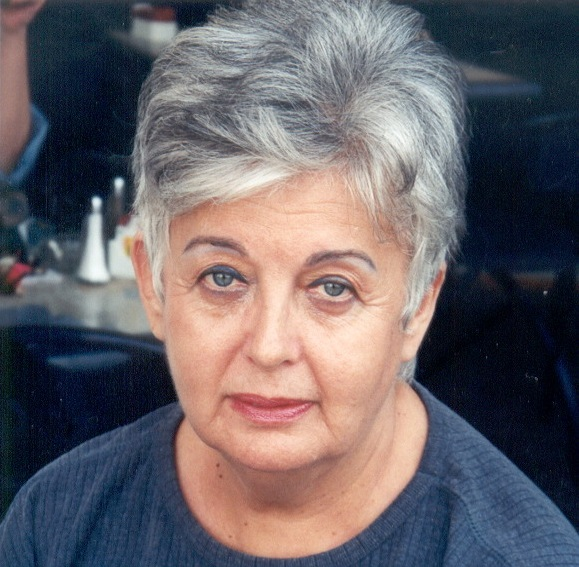
- Šomlo in 2003
- Born: Ana Šomlo; Ана Шомло; 27 March 1935; Negotin, Yugoslavia
- Died: 9 July 2024 (aged 89); Netanya, Israel
- Education: University of Belgrade
- Occupations: Writer, journalist, translator
- Years active: 1957–2024
- Spouse: Ivan Ninić

Ana Šomlo (Serbian: Ана Шомло; 27 March 1935 – 9 July 2024) was a Serbian-Israeli writer and journalist who wrote short prose and novels. She was also a prominent translator from Hebrew into Serbo-Croatian.

== Early life and education ==
Ana Šomlo was born on 27 March 1935 in Negotin, Serbia, to Miroslav Šomlo and Budimka Šomlo (née Smederevac). She spent her early childhood in Negotin. Her father was interned twice, in 1941 and 1942, in a camp near Zaječar. Ana lived until 1943, together with her sister, with relatives from Vršac, after which she returned to Negotin. Due to the anti-Semitic measures of the German authorities, she fled with her father and sister to Malajnica, and then to the Homolje mountains, where they hid until the end of the Second World War. After the war, her family left Negotin and moved to Vršac. From 1946 to 1948, she lived in Pančevo, where her father worked on the design and construction of the bridge that connects Belgrade with the city. After the bridge was completed, the family moved to Novi Sad.

Šomlo studied philology and oriental literature at the University of Belgrade. Upon graduation, she was awarded a scholarship from the American Jewish Joint Distribution Committee, so she enrolled in postgraduate studies at the Hebrew University in Jerusalem in 1957, and remained there for two years to improve her knowledge of Hebrew and Arabic.

== Career ==
During her stay in Israel, Šomlo began writing political news articles and after returning to Belgrade, she was employed by the magazine Duga. She was transferred in 1960 as a reporter to the newly established Belgrade Television. In addition to her work in television, she wrote, translated, and taught Hebrew. She worked an editor of the magazines ТВ – Ревија and РТВ – Теорија и пракса.

As an expert in Hebrew and Israeli literature, Šomlo made a great contribution in the field of translation from Hebrew into Serbian. She published a large number of literary translations and dedicated many years to compiling dictionaries and encyclopedic work. She also compiled the "Hebrew-Serbo-Croatian/Serbo-Croatian-Hebrew Dictionary" and published the textbook "Learn Hebrew Yourself". As a translator from Hebrew, and in Hebrew, she made a significant contribution to strengthening Serbian-Hebrew cultural and literary ties and the promotion of Israeli literature in the world, for which she was awarded the "Kalat Haor" award in 2005. She was a contributor to several encyclopedias: in Prosveta's "Encyclopedia" (Belgrade, 1969) she wrote articles on Israeli literature. In "Encyclopaedia Judaica" (Keter, Jerusalem 1974), she wrote about writers of Jewish origin from the Balkans. In the "Croatian General Lexicon" (Miroslav Krleža Lexicographic Institute, 1996) she wrote about contemporary Israeli writers.

Šomlo also engaged in literary creation, publishing several novels and collections of short stories. For her collection of stories Поново у Јерусалиму ("Back in Jerusalem"), she received an award from the Israeli Ministry of Immigration in 1996. Perhaps the most interesting literary achievement of Šomlo is her book Миленина писма Кафки ("Milena's Letters to Kafka"), which was published in 1988.

=== Activism ===
Šomlo emigrated to Israel in 1992. She was involved with the Hitahdut olej Jugoslavije, the Association of olim from Yugoslavia, of which she was president between 2000 and 2003, also editing its magazine Most.

== Death ==
Šomlo died on 9 July 2024, at the age of 89.

== Works ==
=== Novels ===
- "Леа Штрасер" (Независна издања Слободана Машића, Belgrade, 1980)
- "Гласови дијаспоре" (Књижевне новине, Belgrade, 1985)
- "Миленина писма Кафки" (Књижевна заједница Новог Сада, 1988)
- "Као…" (Спектар, Zagreb, 1983, Просвета, Belgrade, 1990)
- "Хазари или обнова византијског романа", conversations with Milorad Pavić (БИГЗ, Belgrade, 1990)
- "Била сам твоје море: преписка Франца Кафке и Милене Јесенске", (Пешић и синови, Belgrade, 2005)
- "Жути пркос" ("Инђић", Belgrade, 2006)

=== Collections of stories ===
- "Поново у Јерусалиму" (Босанска књига, Sarajevo, 1997 și Просвета, Belgrade, 2006)
- "Идуће године у Јерусалиму" (Мирослав, Belgrade, 2000)

=== Translations from Hebrew into Serbian ===
- Aharon Appelfeld, Badenheim 1939 (Dečje novine, Belgrade, 1989 )
- Anthology of stories from Israel (Багдала, Crușevaț, 1995 )
- Anthology of Israeli poetry and prose (Zidne novine, Sarajevo, 1995 )
- Shimon Peres, New Genesis (БМГ, Belgrade, 1999 )
- Lili Halpert Zamir, Danilo Kiš, A Dark Odyssey (Athens, Belgrade, 2000)
- Shulamit Lapid, Jewelry (Clio, Belgrade, 2004 )
- David Grosman, Лављи мед – Мит о Самсону (Геопоетика, Belgrade, 2006)
- Israel Gutman, Haima Shacker, ''The Holocaust and its Significance (Завод за уџбенике, Службени гласник, Belgrade, 2010) – with Ella Krstic
- The power of words and other Israeli stories (Кућа поезије, Banja Luka, 2014)
- Anthology of Modern Israeli Poetry (Кућа поезије, Banja Luka, 2015)

=== Dictionaries and manuals ===
- "Хебрејско–српскохрватски и српскохрватско–хебрејски речник" ("Hebrew-Serbo-Croatian and Serbo-Croatian-Hebrew Dictionary", Yugoslav Association of Jews in Israel, Tel Aviv, 1993)
- "Учите сами хебрејски" (Издање аутора, Netanya, 1996)
- "Хебрејско–српски речник", Јасен, (Belgrade, 2007) ("Hebrew – Serbian Dictionary", Jasen, Belgrade, 2007)

=== Other works ===
- Collection of interviews Бити и опстати на телевизији (Radio Television of Serbia, Belgrade, 2004)
- Мој свет књига: дневник читања (Пешић и синови, Belgrade, 2008)
