= Dușan Pârvulovici =

Minority rights activist for the Timok Vlachs in Serbia

- Born: 6 July 1966 (age 59); Negotin, Yugoslavia (now Serbia)
- Occupation: Activist
- Known for: Defending the minority rights of the Timok Vlachs in Serbia

Dușan Pârvulovici (born 6 July 1966; Serbian: Душан Првуловић / Dušan Prvulović) is one of the main figures of the movement for the minority rights of the Timok Vlachs. This community lives in the Timok Valley, a region in Serbia where they lack churches and schools in their native Romanian language and are sometimes regarded as part of the Romanians. Pârvulovici has led and founded several organizations for human rights and for the emancipation of the Timok Vlachs, notably the Committee for Human Rights Negotin, the Federation of the Romanians of Serbia and the news agency Timoc Press. Serbian justice issued trials and criminal cases against Pârvulovici since 2005, and he was jailed for a year and a half in 2021, prompting a strong backlash from Romania.

== Biography ==
Dușan Pârvulovici was born on 6 July 1966 in the town of Negotin, Yugoslavia (now Serbia). He graduated from the Faculty of Agriculture of the University of Belgrade as an agricultural engineer. Pârvulovici is the president of the Committee for Human Rights Negotin, an apolitical and non-profit NGO aiming to defend human rights in the area which he founded on 17 July 1999. He also led the Federation of the Romanians of Serbia and is the director of the news agency Timoc Press. Commenting on the situation of the Timok Vlachs in 2012, Pârvulovici stated that, while Serbian legislation on minorities was good, things in practice were different, declaring that "in this area are also taking place some media campaigns about the danger of a new Kosovo in the Timok Valley".

On 21 May 2005, Pârvulovici announced that together with the priest Bojan Aleksandrović, an event in the Romanian language in the ruins of the medieval Koroglaš Monastery would be organized to commemorate the Christian soldiers who died fighting the Ottoman Empire in the Battle of Rovine. After this, a court in Negotin held a hearing the next day, 22 May, in which Pârvulovici was accused of "spreading racial, religious and national hatred". A trial against him was suspended after the intervention of authorities in Romania, but criminal cases and court proceedings against Pârvulovici continued for years. Three verdicts on his situation were issued, but all were annulled due to a lack of evidence.

In 2018, he attended the debate "Bessarabia and the Timok" (Basarabia și Timocul), organized in the Palace of the Parliament of Romania, in which Romanian deputies and senators, representatives of the Romanian minority in Serbia and mayors of localities in Moldova, among others, participated. Pârvulovici spoke of the struggles of the Vlachs, regarded by him and in this debate as Romanians, in Serbia's Timok Valley, "forcibly assimilated by Serbian state authorities, who consider them Vlachs and deny them the same status as Romanians in the Serbian Banat, who receive education in their mother tongue". Pârvulovici called on Moldovan students who had attended the event to return to Moldova "to talk to those at home about Romanianism and Union".

In 2021, Pârvulovici was sentenced to a year and a half in prison after the long legal battle in which he saw himself involved and was jailed in 25 June of that year. In response to his conviction, he issued a message a few days earlier on 22 June in which he said that he was being imprisoned for his defense of the Romanian people in Serbia, also stating that there was neither a Vlach language nor a Vlach dialect and ending his declaration with the statement "Long live our Romanian nation!". Claudiu Târziu, then co-president of the Alliance for the Union of Romanians and member of the Chamber of Deputies of Romania, condemned Pârvulovici's imprisonment. Dumitru Flucuș, member of the National Liberal Party and of the Chamber of Deputies, also protested against it, and he announced that 56 members of the Parliament of Romania had signed an appeal to the President of Romania, the Ministry of Foreign Affairs of Romania and the Embassy of Serbia in Bucharest to help Pârvulovici against the imprisonment that the appeal deemed unjustified.
