= Prahova =

Prahova may refer to:

- Prahova (river), Romania
- Prahova Valley, Romania
- Prahova County, named after the river Prahova, Romania
  - Prahova Ploieşti, a football club based in Ploieşti, Romania
  - Stadionul Prahova, a football-only stadium in Ploieşti, Romania

== See also ==
- Prahovo, a village in the municipality of Negotin, Serbia
