= Koroglaš Monastery =

Serbian Orthodox monastery in Miloševo, Serbia

Koroglaš monastery
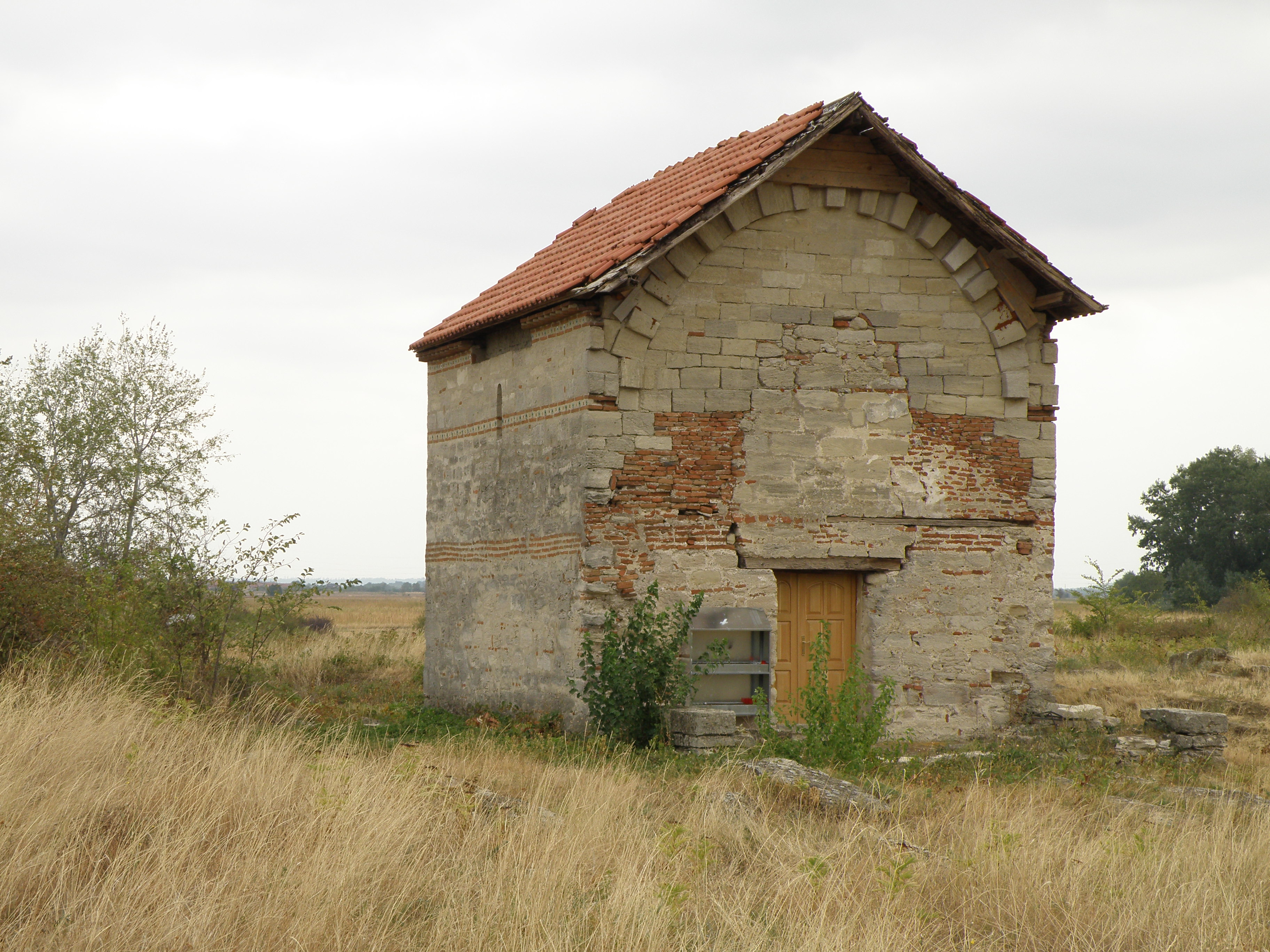
- Koroglaš monastery
- Interactive map of Koroglaš monastery

Monastery information
- Full name: Манастир Корoглаш
- Order: Serbian Orthodox
- Established: 14th century
- Controlled churches: Miloševo church

People
- Founder: Stefan Milutin
- Important associated figures: Prince Marko

Site
- Location: Miloševo, Negotin, Serbia
- Coordinates: 44°16′08″N 22°31′16″E

The Koroglaš Monastery (Serbian: Манастир Корoглаш, romanized: Manastir Koroglaš; Romanian: Mănăstirea Coroglași) is an abandoned 14th century Serbian Orthodox monastery in the village of Miloševo, Negotin, Serbia, thought to have been founded by Serbian king Stefan Milutin of the Nemanjić dynasty or by Mircea I of Wallachia. Legend says that King of Prilep Prince Marko was buried here after returning from the Battle of Rovine against Mircea I of Wallachia in 1395. The same legend mentioned that Mircea the Elder of Wallachia erected the monastery in memory of Christians killed in the battle of Rovine and in memory of Marko A medieval necropolis of the monastery is partly excavated.

Koroglaš Monastery was declared Monument of Culture of Great Importance in 1979, and it is protected by Republic of Serbia.

== See also ==
- Monuments of Culture of Great Importance
- Tourism in Serbia
