= Aleksandrovac (Negotin) =

Aleksandrovac Александровац (Serbian)
- Village (Selo)
- Location within Serbia
- Coordinates: 44°5′2″N 22°34′39″E
- Country: Serbia
- District: Bor District
- Municipality: Negotin

Population (2022)
  - Total: 252
- Time zone: UTC+1 (CET)
  - Summer (DST): UTC+2 (CEST)

Aleksandrovac (Romanian: Zlocutea) is a village in the municipality of Negotin, Serbia. According to the 2002 census, the village had a population of 588 people. In 2022, it was still only 252.
