= Rogljevo =

- Village
- Location within Serbia
- Coordinates: 44°7′25″N 22°33′51″E
- Country: Serbia
- District: Bor District
- Municipality: Negotin

Population (2002)
  - Total: 183
- Time zone: UTC+1 (CET)
  - Summer (DST): UTC+2 (CEST)

Rogljevo (Serbian Cyrillic: Рогљево) is a village in the municipality of Negotin, Serbia. According to the 2002 census, the village has a population of 183 people. Along with the nearby village of Rajac, it is known for historic wine cellars.
