= Mihajlovac (Negotin) =

Mihajlovac Михајловац Mihăilă, Meilovăț
- Village
- Location within Serbia
- Coordinates: 44°21′55″N 22°30′01″E
- Country: Serbia
- District: Bor District
- Municipality: Negotin

Population (2002)
  - Total: 718
- Time zone: UTC+1 (CET)
  - Summer (DST): UTC+2 (CEST)

Mihajlovac (Serbian: Михајловац; Romanian: Mihăilă or Meilovăț) is a village in the municipality of Negotin, Serbia. According to the 2002 census, the village has a population of 718 people.
