= Vratna =

Vratna Вратна
- Village
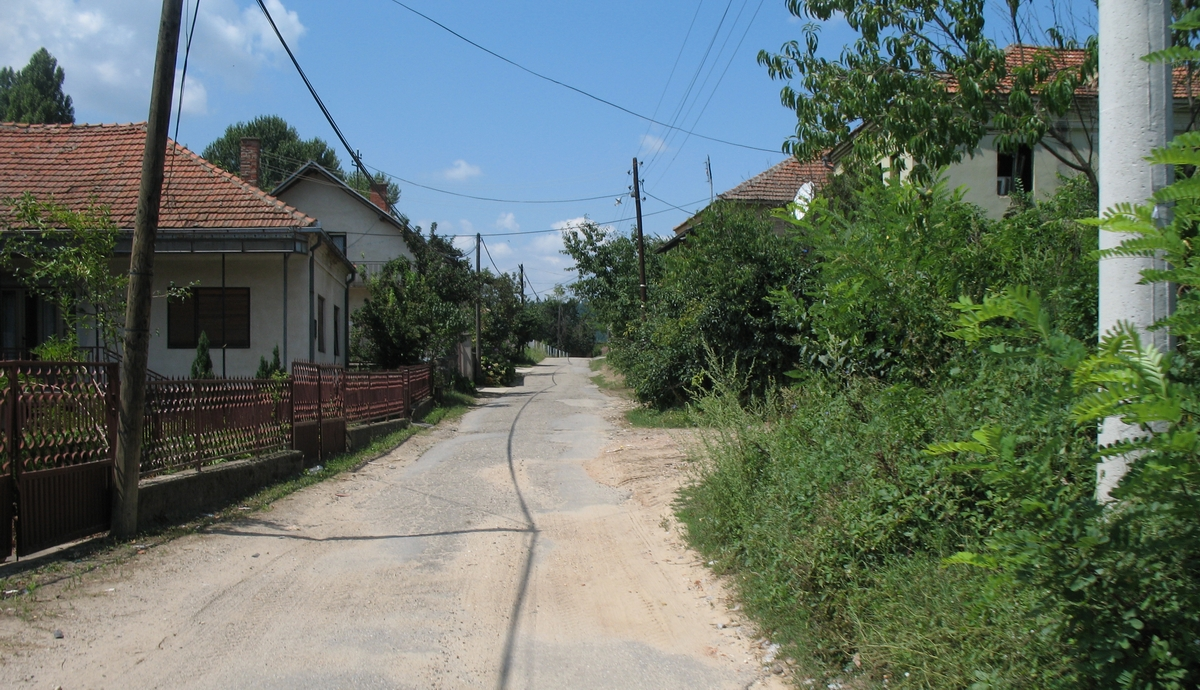
- Street of Vratna, Serbia

- Location within Serbia
- Country: Serbia
- District: Bor District
- Municipality: Negotin

Population (2002)
  - Total: 316
- Time zone: UTC+1 (CET)
  - Summer (DST): UTC+2 (CEST)

Vratna (Serbian Cyrillic: Вратна) is a village in the municipality of Negotin, Serbia. According to the 2002 census, the village has a population of 316 people.
