= Veljkovo =

- Village
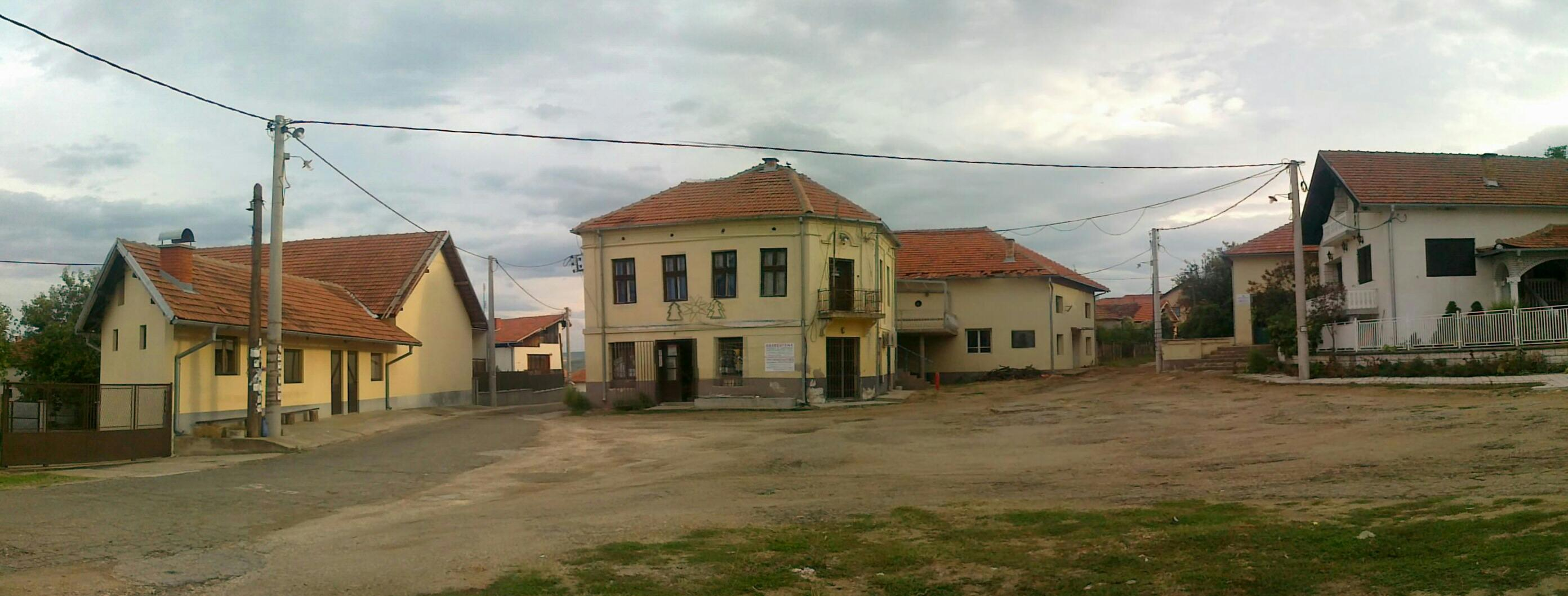

- Location within Serbia
- Country: Serbia
- District: Bor District
- Municipality: Negotin

Population (2002)
  - Total: 206
- Time zone: UTC+1 (CET)
  - Summer (DST): UTC+2 (CEST)

Veljkovo is a village in the municipality of Negotin, Serbia. At the 2002 census, the village had a population of 206 people.
