= Rajac (Negotin) =

- Village
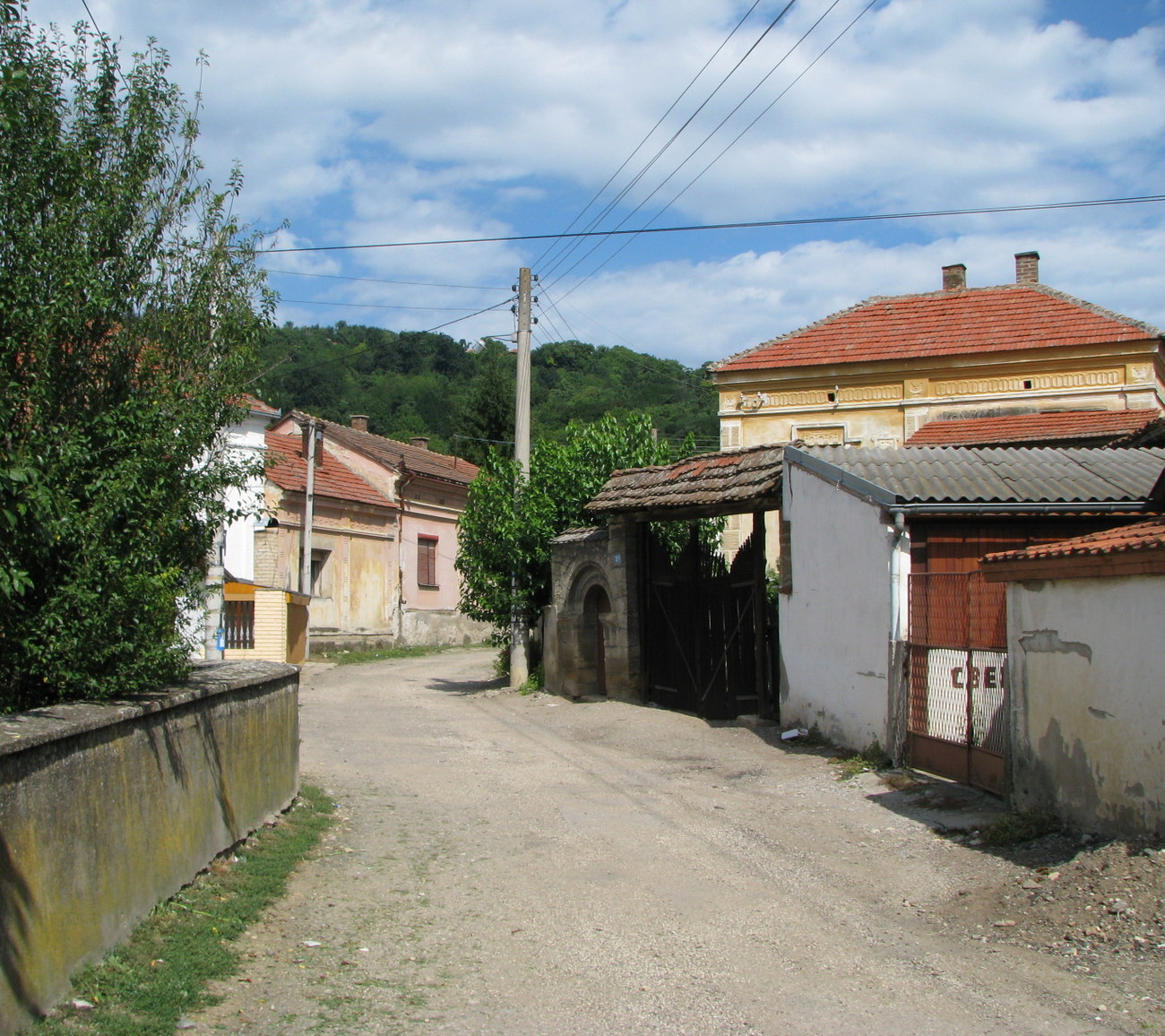

- Location within Serbia
- Country: Serbia
- District: Bor District
- Municipality: Negotin
- Time zone: UTC+1 (CET)
  - Summer (DST): UTC+2 (CEST)

Rajac (Serbian Cyrillic: Рајац) is a village 22 km south of Negotin in Serbia. It is known for its historic wine cellars and is a popular touristic destination. Nearby, there is a village of Rogljevo, also known by historic wine cellars.

== History ==
The village church, dedicated to the Ascension (Вазнесења Господњег), was built in 1870.
