= Sikole =

- Village
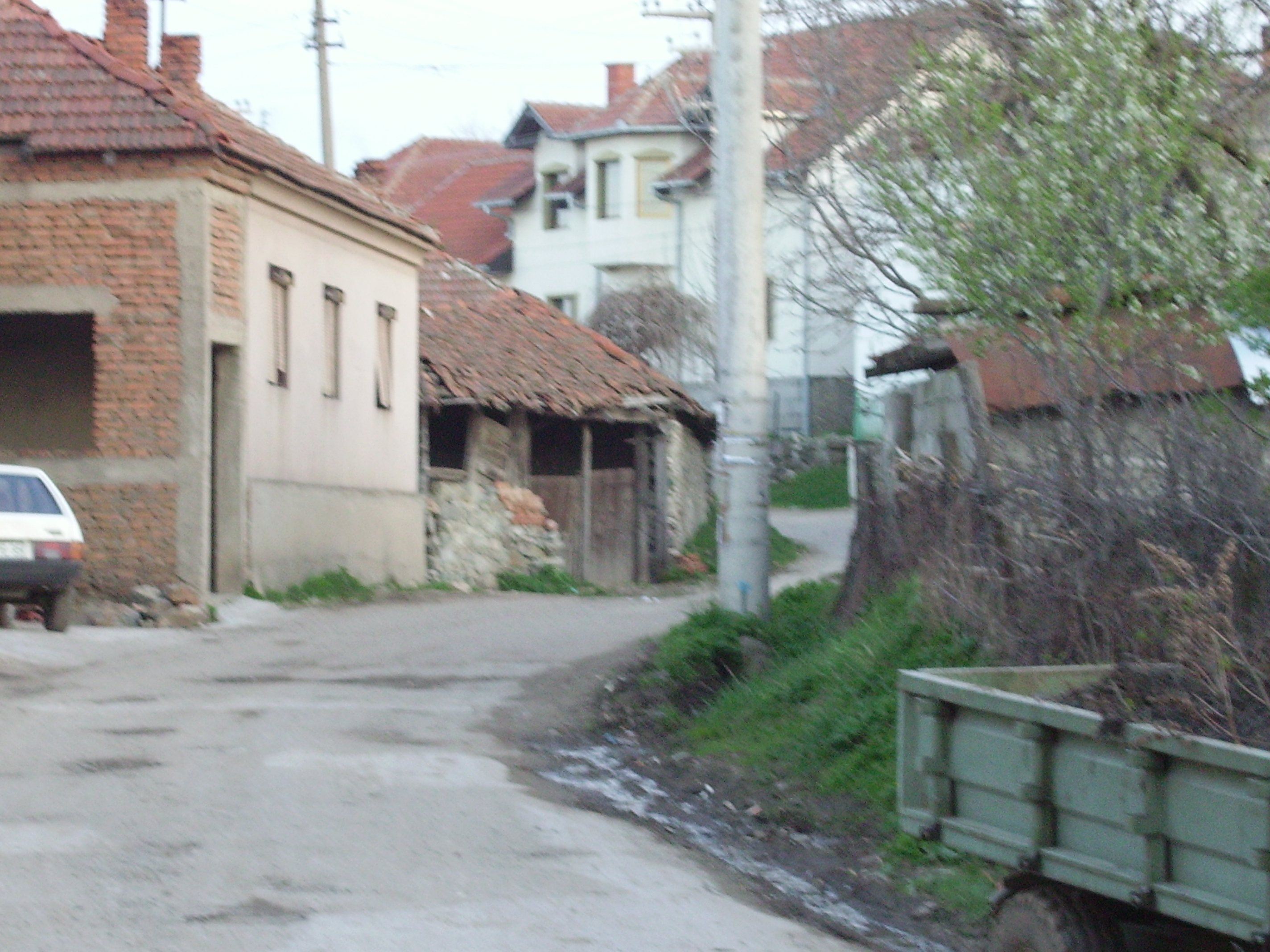

- Location within Serbia
- Country: Serbia
- District: Bor District
- Municipality: Negotin

Population (2002)
  - Total: 838
- Time zone: UTC+1 (CET)
  - Summer (DST): UTC+2 (CEST)

Sikole is a village in the municipality of Negotin, Serbia. According to the 2002 census, the village has a population of 838 people.
