= Aleksandrovac, Žabari =

Aleksandrovac Александровац
- Village
- Location within Serbia
- Coordinates: 44°26′42″N 21°12′42″E
- Country: Serbia
- District: Braničevo District

Population (2002)
  - Total: 1,546
- Time zone: UTC+1 (CET)
  - Summer (DST): UTC+2 (CEST)

Aleksandrovac is a village in the Municipalities of Serbia. According to the 2002 census, the village has a population of 1546 people.
