= Negotin =

Negotin Неготин (Serbian)
- Town and municipality
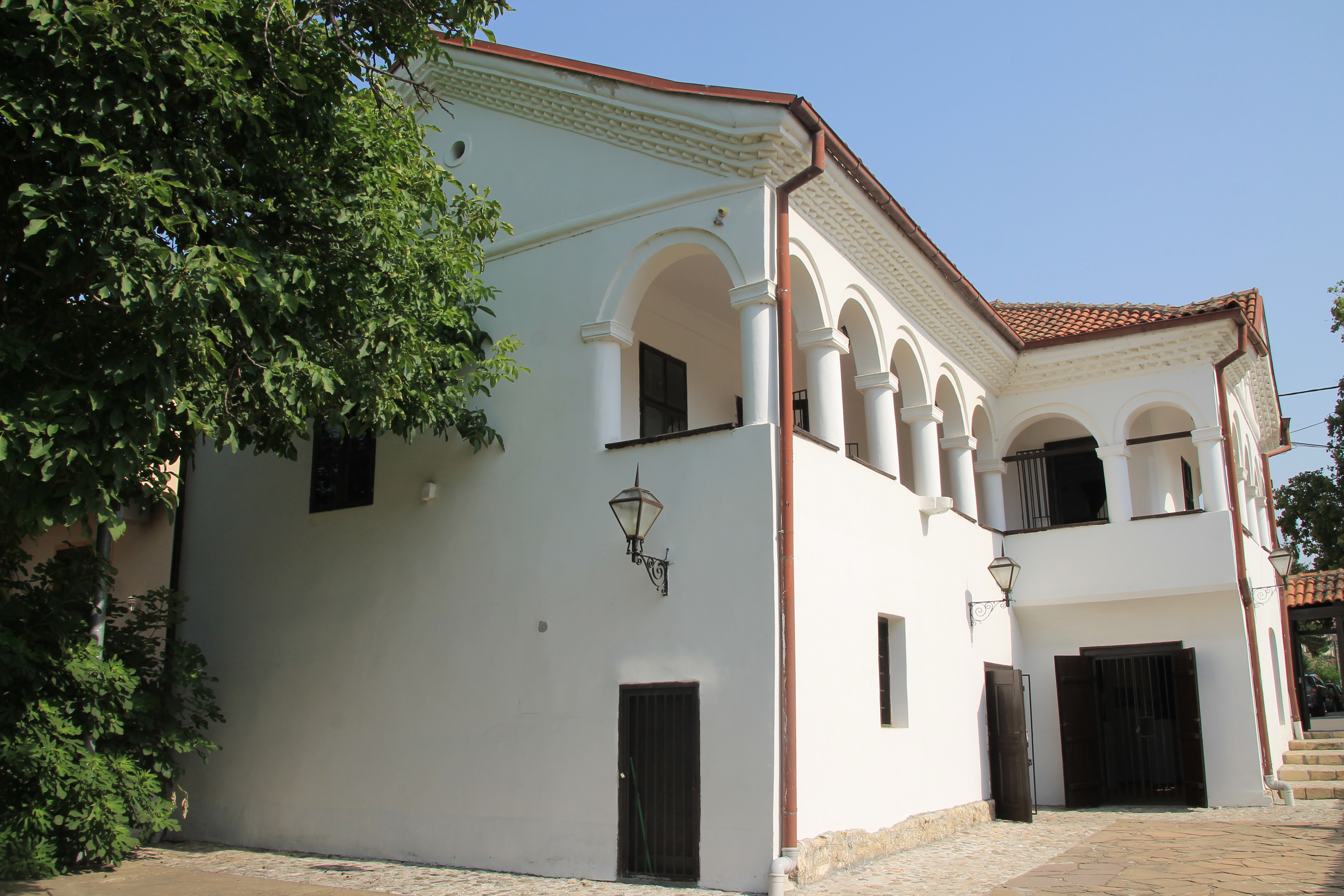
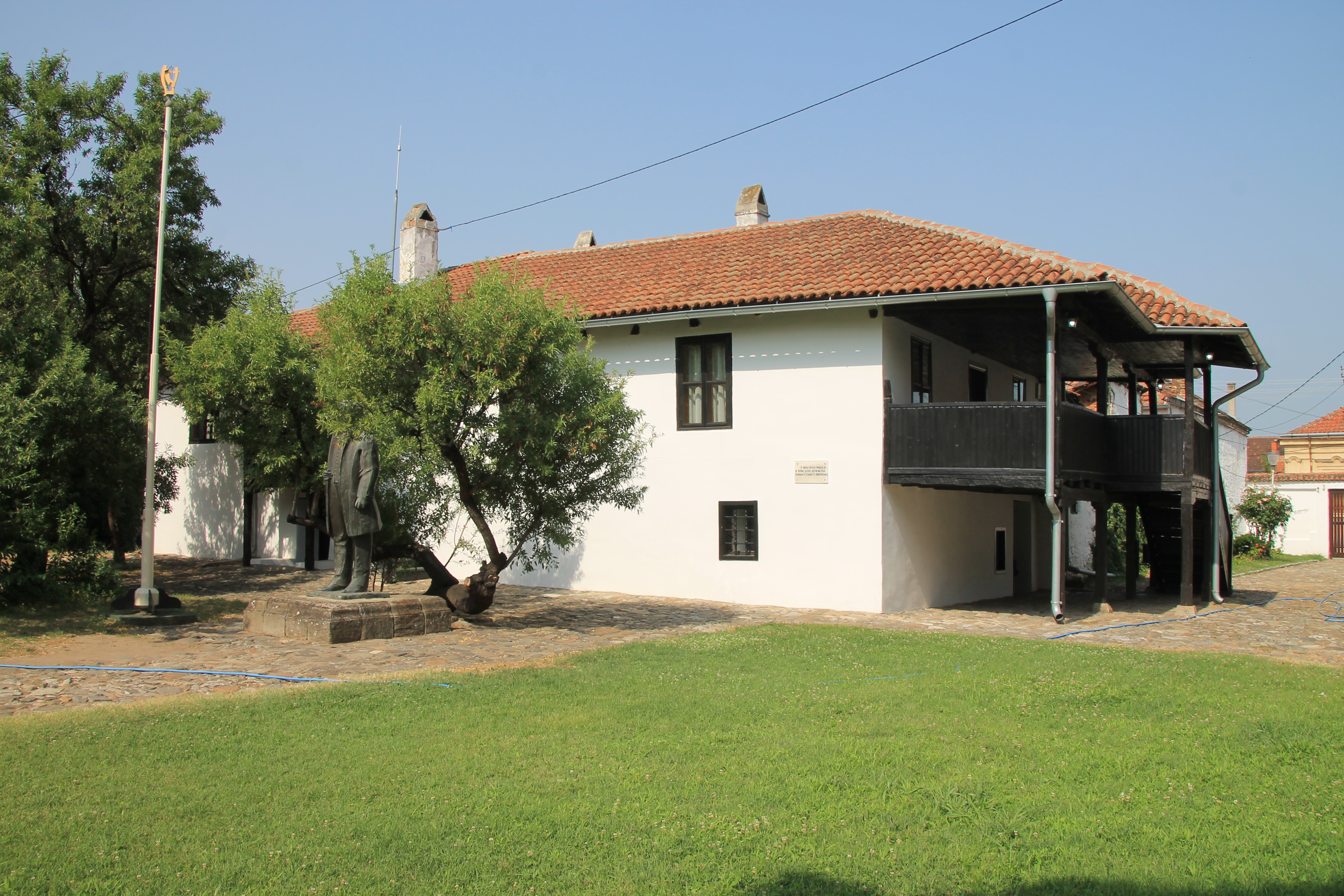
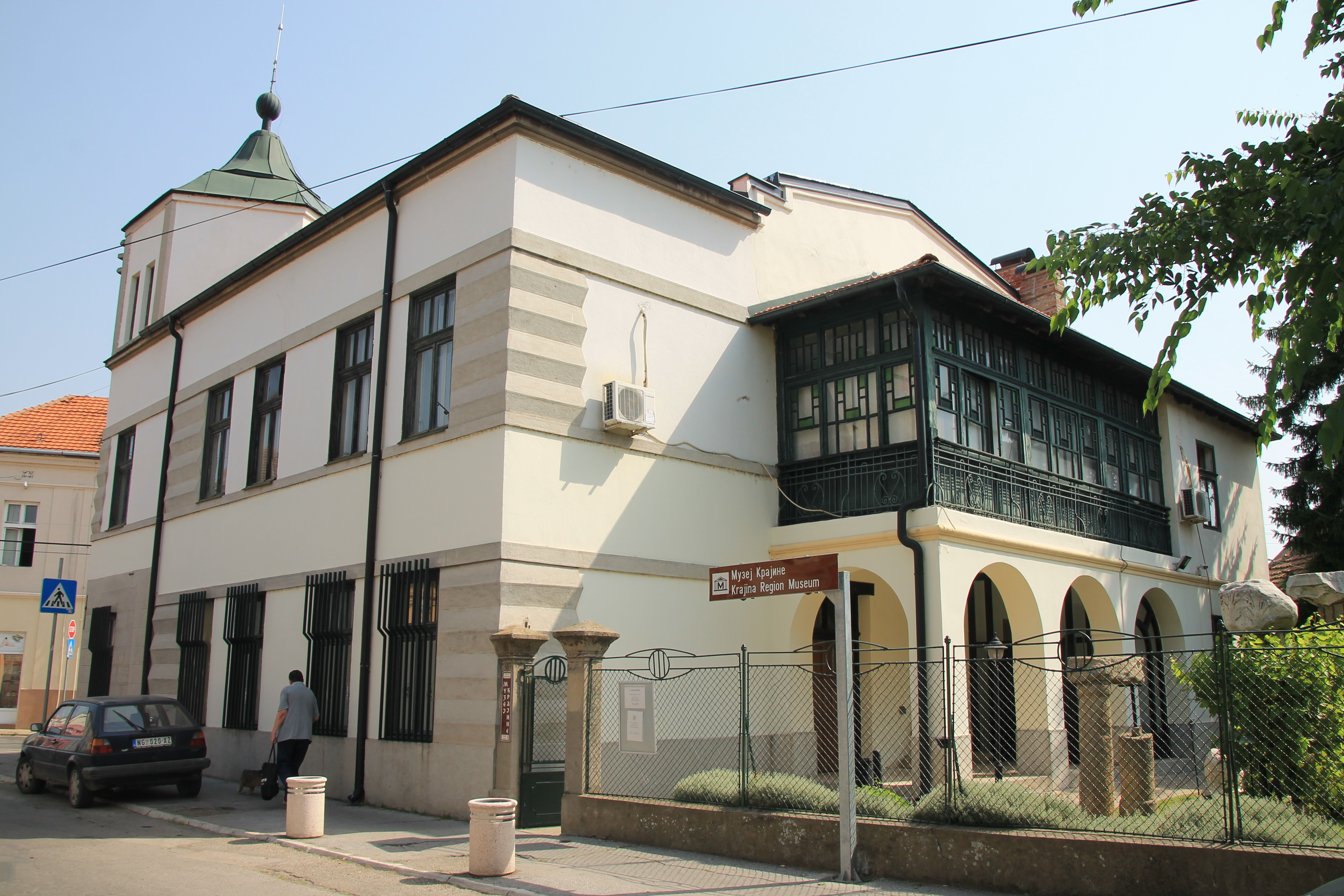
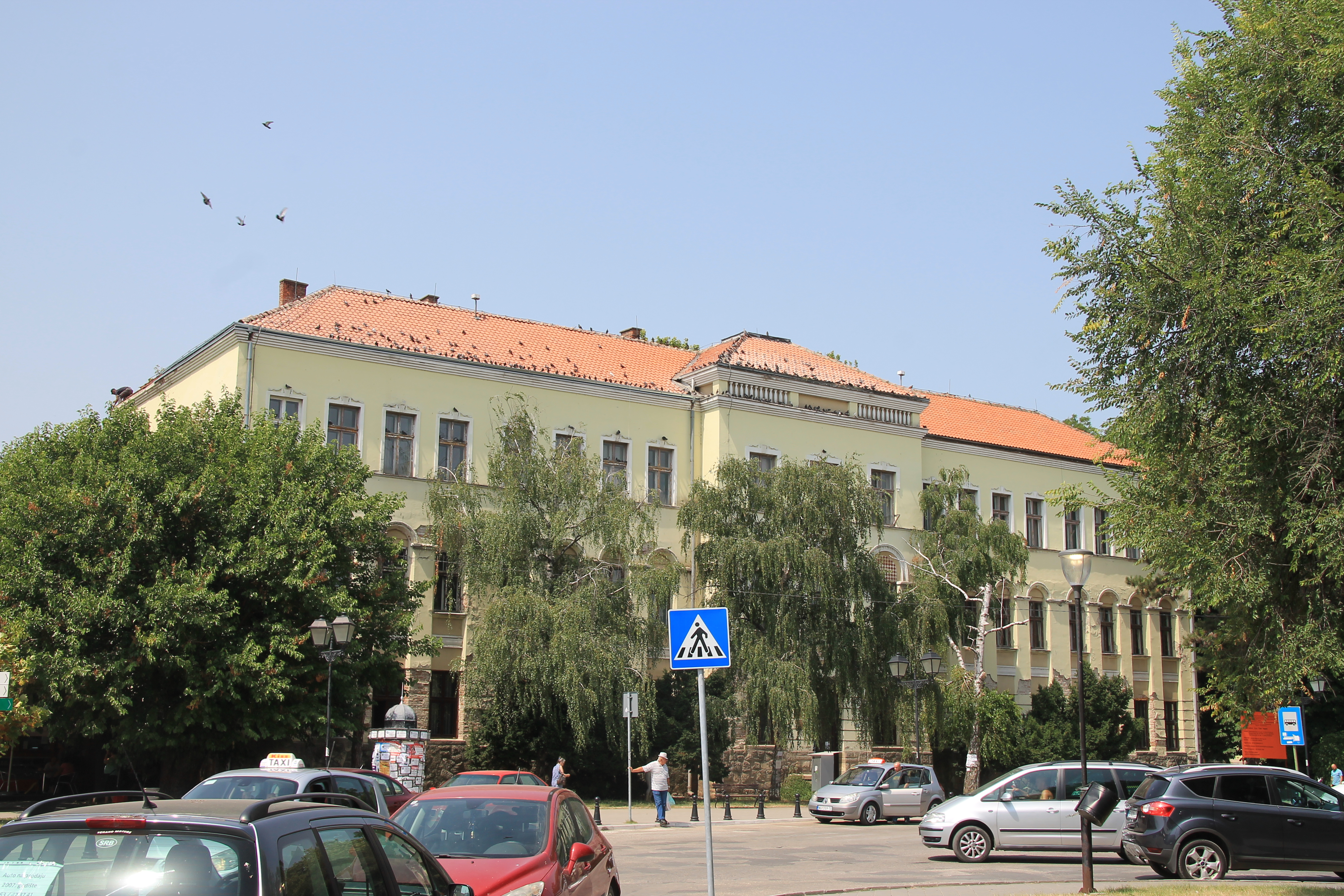
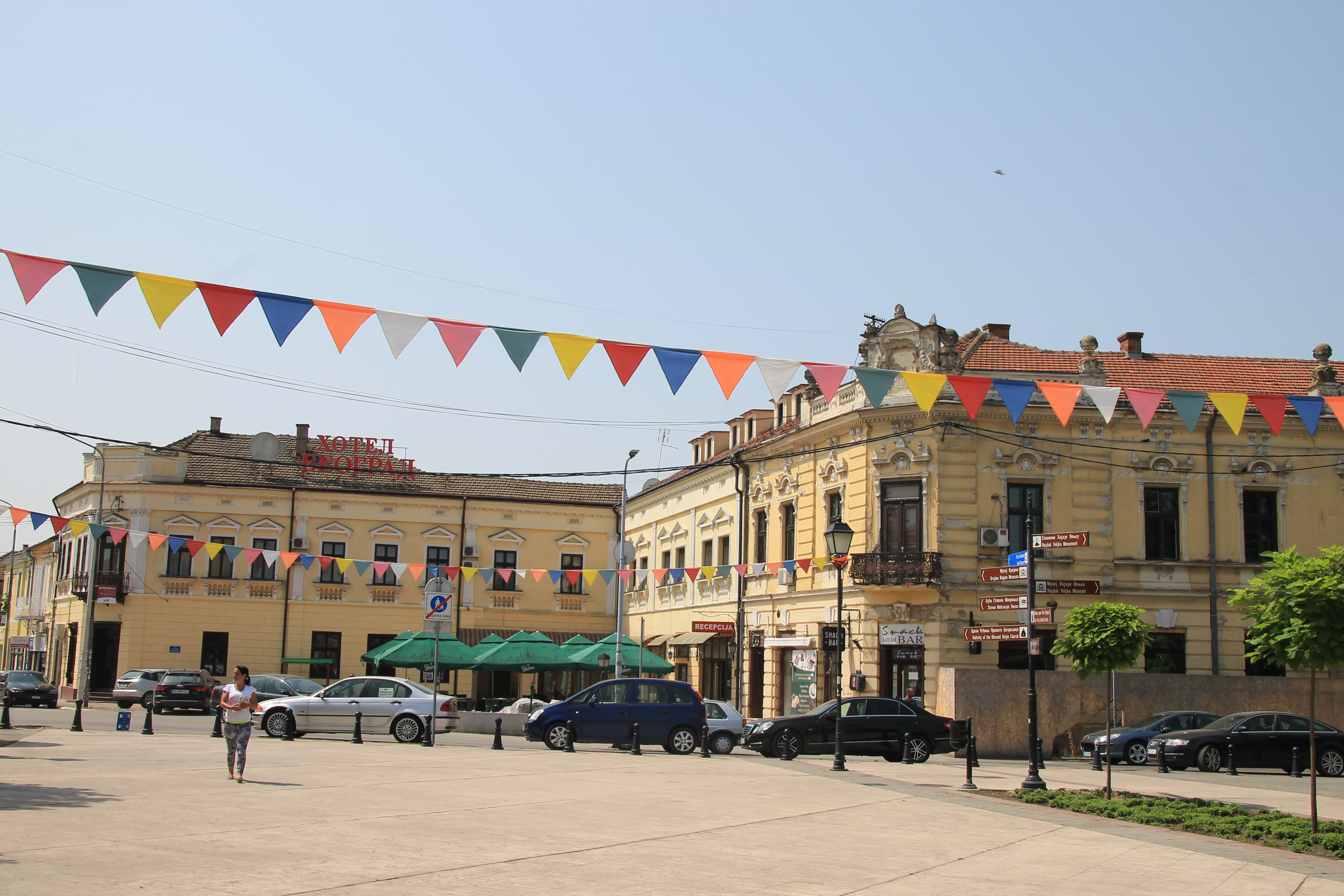
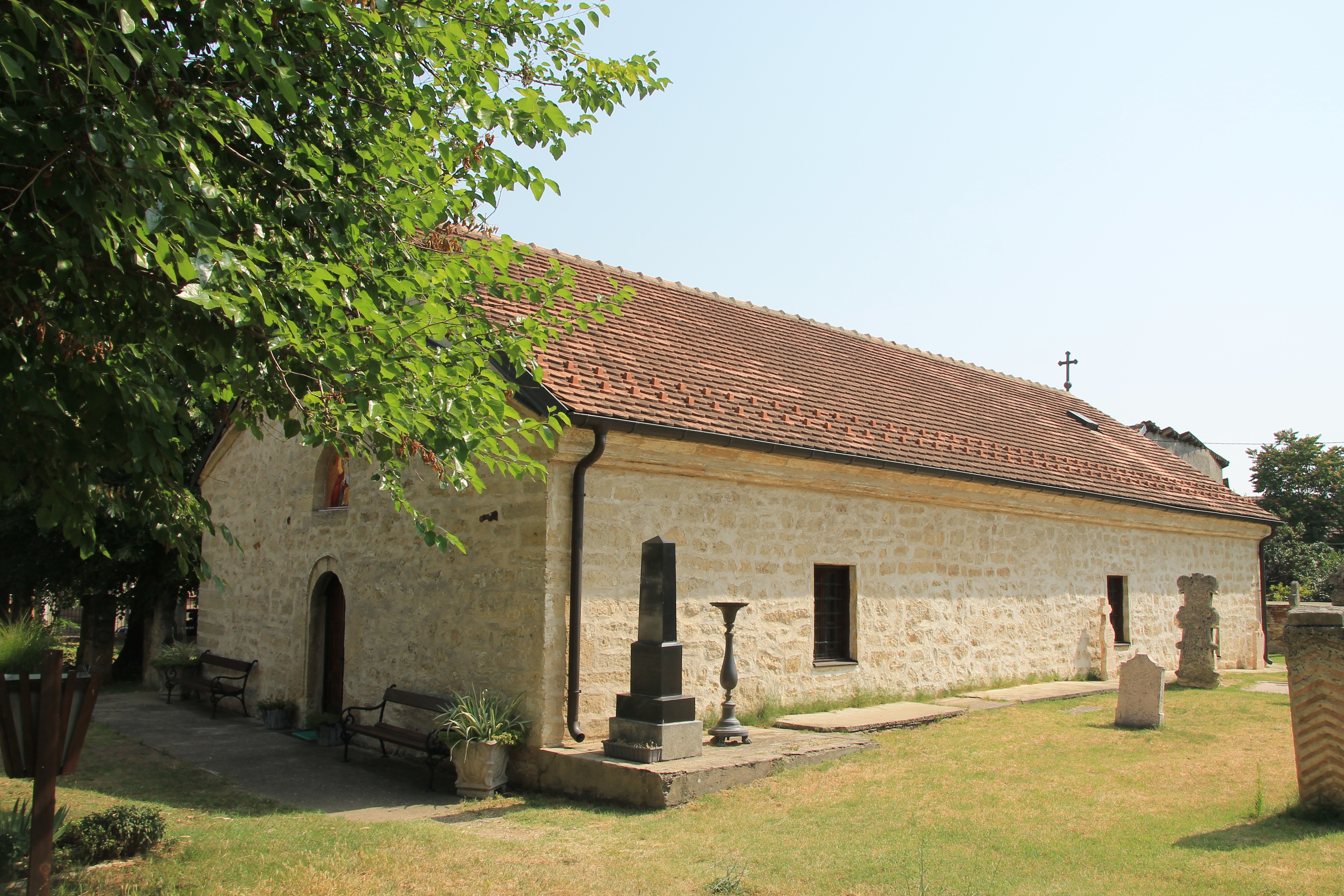
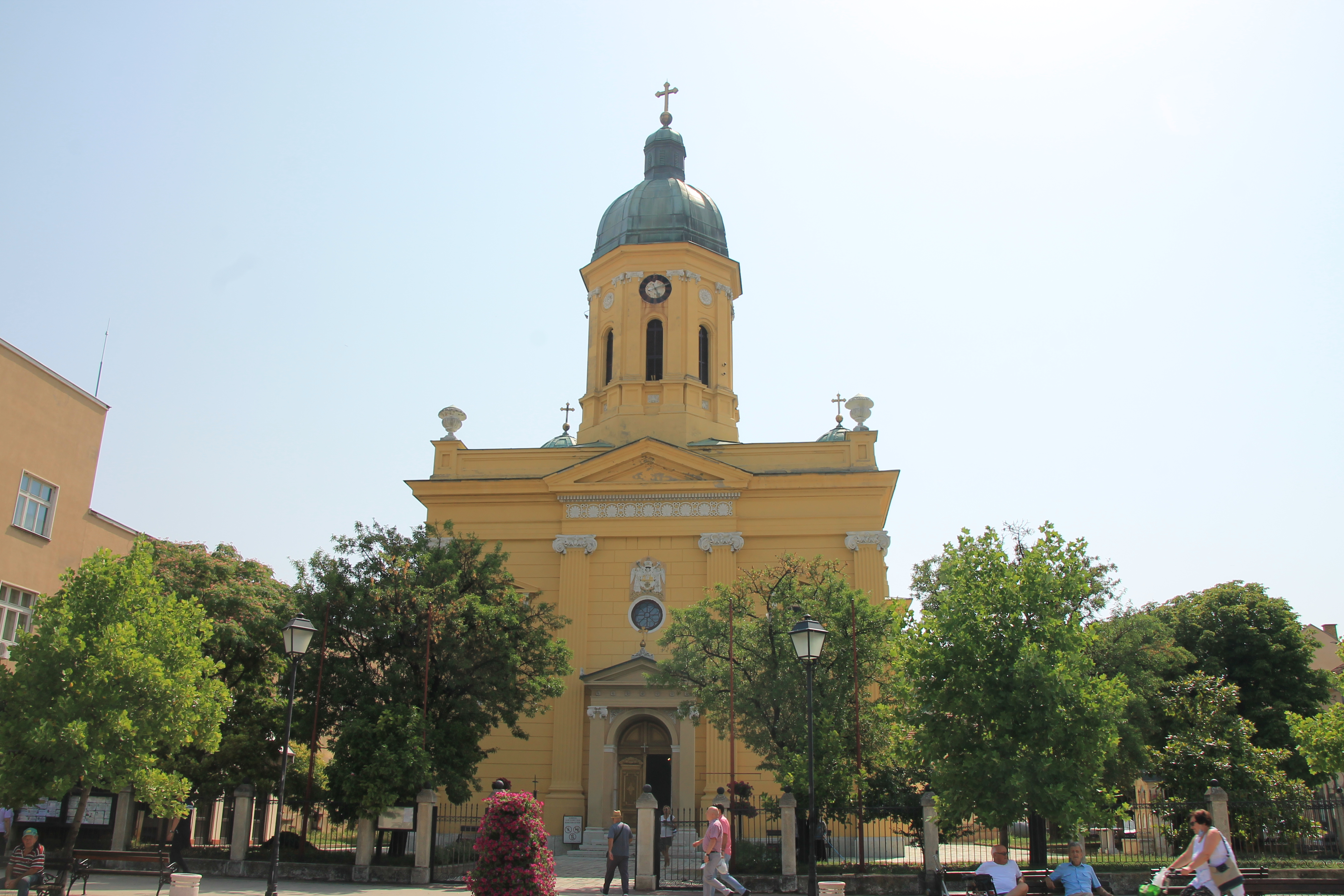
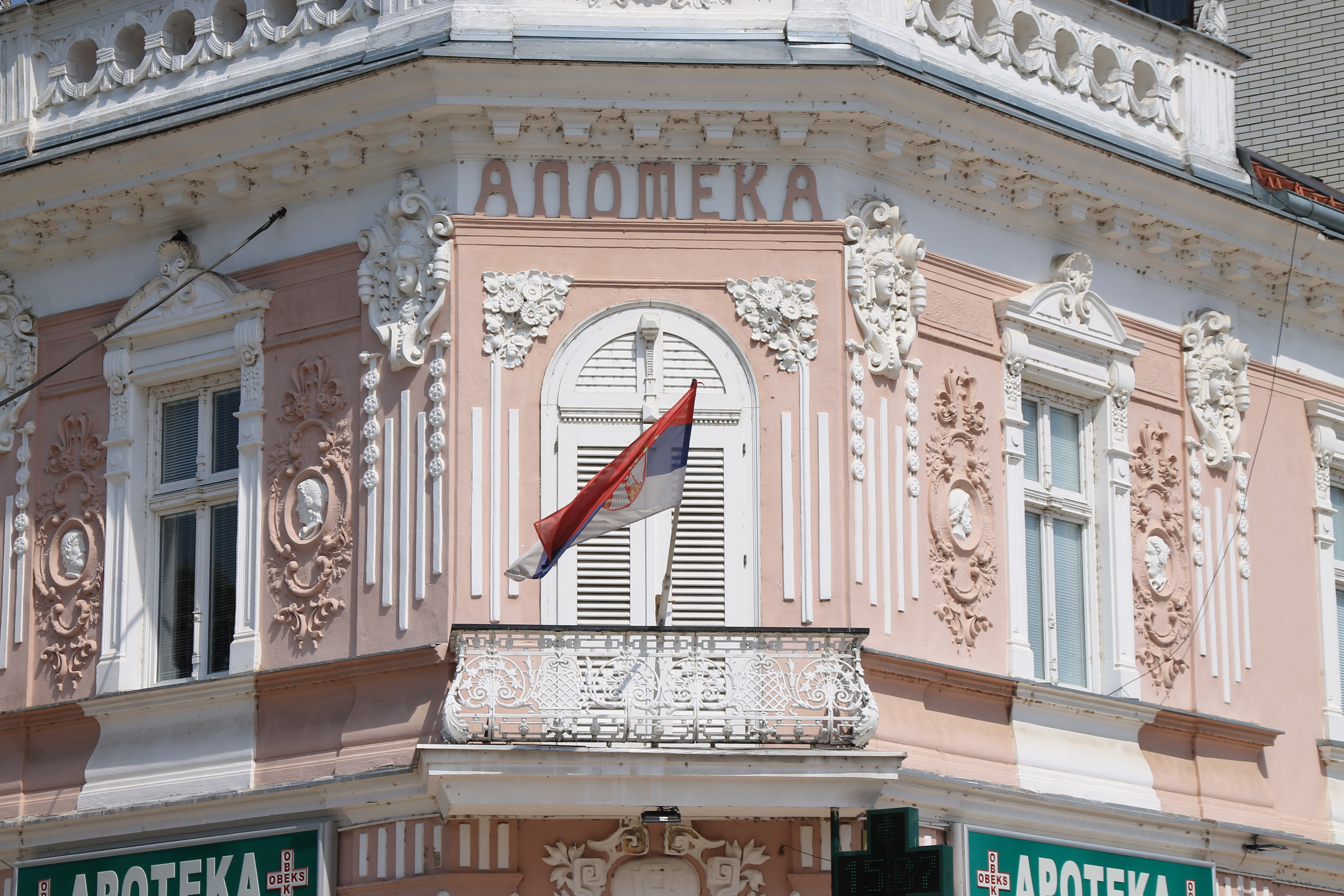
- Negotin

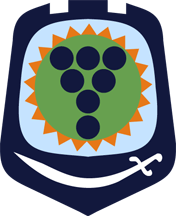
- Coat of arms

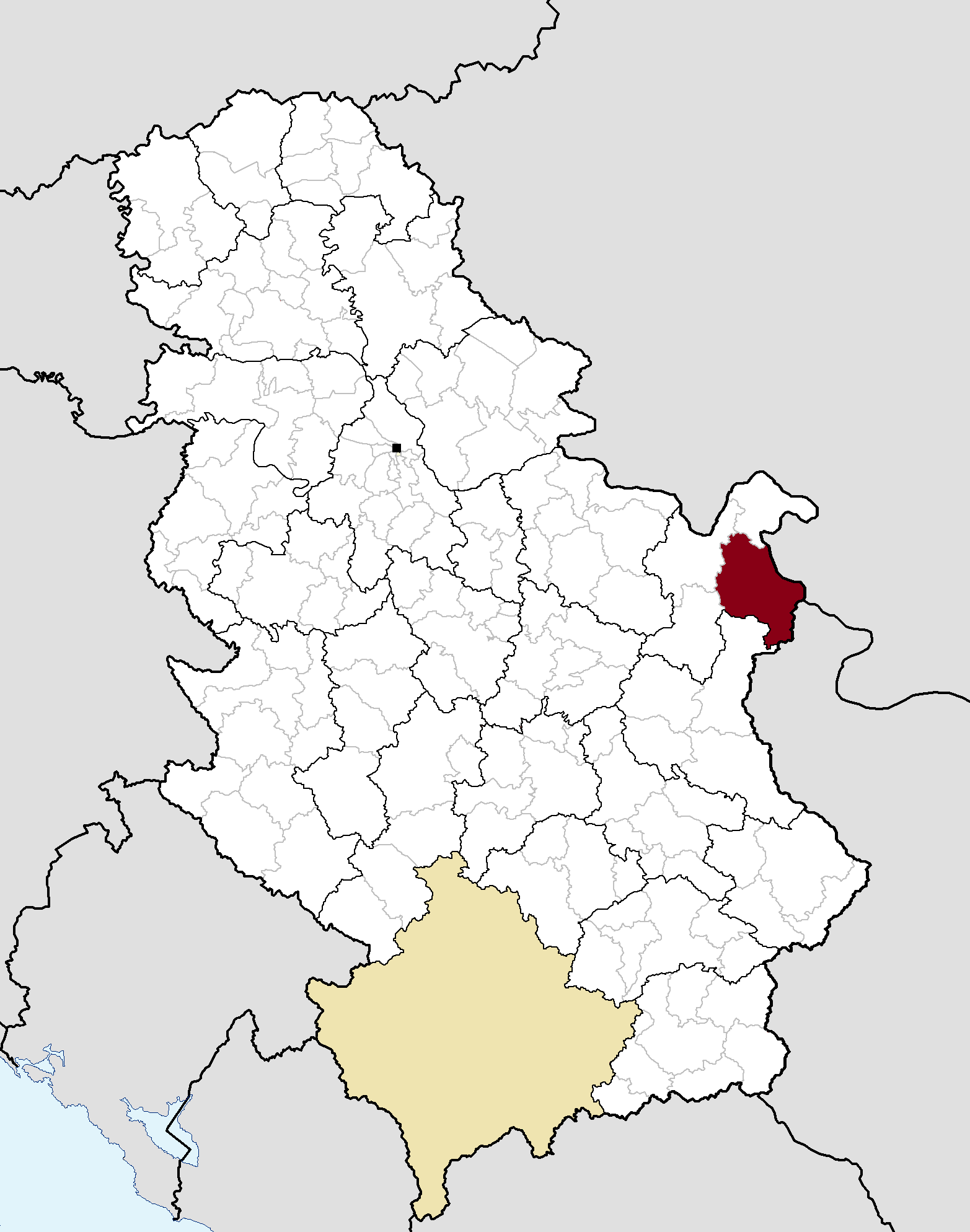
- Location of the municipality of Negotin within Serbia
- Coordinates: 44°13′45″N 22°31′50″E
- Country: Serbia
- Region: Southern and Eastern Serbia
- District: Bor
- Settlements: 39

Government
  - Mayor: Vladimir Veličković (SNS)

Area
  - Municipality: 1,089 km^{2} (420 sq mi)
- Elevation: 46 m (151 ft)

Population (2022 census)
  - Town: 14,647
  - Municipality: 28,261
- Time zone: UTC+1 (CET)
  - Summer (DST): UTC+2 (CEST)
- Postal code: 19300
- Area code: +381(0)19
- Car plates: NG
- Website: www.negotin.rs

Negotin (Serbian Cyrillic: Неготин, [nêɡotiːn]; Romanian: Negotin) is a town and municipality located in the Bor District of eastern Serbia. It is situated near the borders between Serbia, Romania and Bulgaria. It is the judicial center of the Bor District. The population of the town is 14,647, while the municipality has a population of 28,261 (2022 census).

== History ==
=== Name ===
The etymology of the town's name is unclear, and there are a few possibilities as to its background:

1. The Romance name origin thesis, such as the merchant place (cf. Romanian "negoț" or Spanish "negocios"), and the fact that Negotin is in a region with the presence of a significant Romanian minority, similar to its namesake Negotino in North Macedonia with an Aromanian presence.
2. There is also the Slavonic origin hypothesis:, Proto-Slavonic "něga" (нѣгa) means "care" and the suffix "-ota//-otina" means "the action undergone or carried out", thus rendering Negotin as "a place of retreat for healing", and the city historically being located secluded amidst marshes would support the Slavonic hypothesis.
3. The book O Perevode Manassijnoj letopisi na slovenskij jazyk. (De versione Chronicorum Manassis in linguam slovenicam secundum duo apographa: Vaticanum et patriarchalis bibliothecae, cum primis lineis historiae Bulgarorum.), Semen [sic], 1842, gives Něgotinъ (to wit: Нѣготинъ) as a Serbian-Slavonic variant of Latin Antigonia thus changed after the Slavs arrived to Roman Moesia.
4. "Negotin" may yet have been derived from Celtic words "neges" and "tin", meaning "The fortress of war".

Negotin is first mentioned in 1530 as a settlement.

=== Early ===
The Thracians dominated the region with the Celtic Scordisci advancing after 279 BC. The Roman conquest in the 1st century BC weakened the Paleo-Balkan tribes. The Moesi, a Thracio-Dacian tribe, were defeated by the Roman army under the Marcus Licinius Crassus who was Roman consul in 30 BC. The region was organized into Moesia Inferior in 87 AD by Emperor Domitian. Later was included in the province of Dacia Remesiana.

Hellenistic religious influence is attested through archeological findings in Rovine and Tamnič where Heracles was worshipped: a relief of Zeus, Herakles and Dionysos found in Bukovo.

The Roman site of Selište with necropolis has been excavated in the village of Rogljevo. Silver and gold fibulae from 250 to 320 AD have been found at sites in Negotin.

=== Middle Ages ===
In the early Middle Ages, the first Slavonic tribe to settle here were the Timočani.

During the 9th-11th centuries and in the 13th century the territory of modern-day North-Eastern Serbia was a part of the Bulgarian Empire.

=== Ottoman Empire ===
Until the beginning of the 18th century, Negotin was a small town, with no strategic and little cultural importance, within the Ottoman territory of Rûm, in the nahi of Krajina, which along with some other parts of Sanjak of Vidin had a certain degree of autonomy as a vaqf of Valide sultan (each reigning sultan's mother), in that all tax was collected by the local Orthodox Christian Serbian or Vlach Knez and not by a Muslim state officer.

At the beginning of the 18th century Austrians conducted a major build-up as a fortified town and their stronghold in their south-eastern territories (i.e., while they held it, in 1717–1739, when it was a part of the newly established territorial unit of the Banat of Temeswar). After a period of renewed Turkish occupation, Negotin was temporary occupied in 1804 by Hajduk Veljko's rebels during the First Serbian Uprising.

=== The Serbian Revolutions of 1804–33 ===
After being liberated in 1804–10, Negotin quickly gained importance and size. The civilized life thrived and the government, as in the most parts of then-liberated Serbia, achieved much in matters of education and modernization. However, these great days were short lived: In 1813, after Napoleon had successfully taken Russia and Austria out of the game and therefore helping Serbia, the Turks crushed the ill-fated state of the Serbs. The defenders of Negotin chose not to evacuate and became besieged in the then-fortified town. Eventually, a Turkish gunman sighted Hajduk Veljko and shot his cannon. Veljko was hit in the chest by a cannonball and died immediately. His co-fighters buried him in an unmarked grave, so that the Turks couldn't exhume and decapitate him, as they used to do with all fallen Christian fighters. Once again, Negotin was conquered.

The Second Serbian Uprising of 1815 brought nothing to Negotin initially, having only liberated Belgrade and its vicinity. Thanks to the smart diplomacy of the Prince Miloš Obrenović, and the tactics of voivode Stevan Stevanović Tenka with 600 soldiers at the gate of the city, this part of the country was once and for all liberated in 1833, with practically no fighting.

=== The second half of the 19th century ===
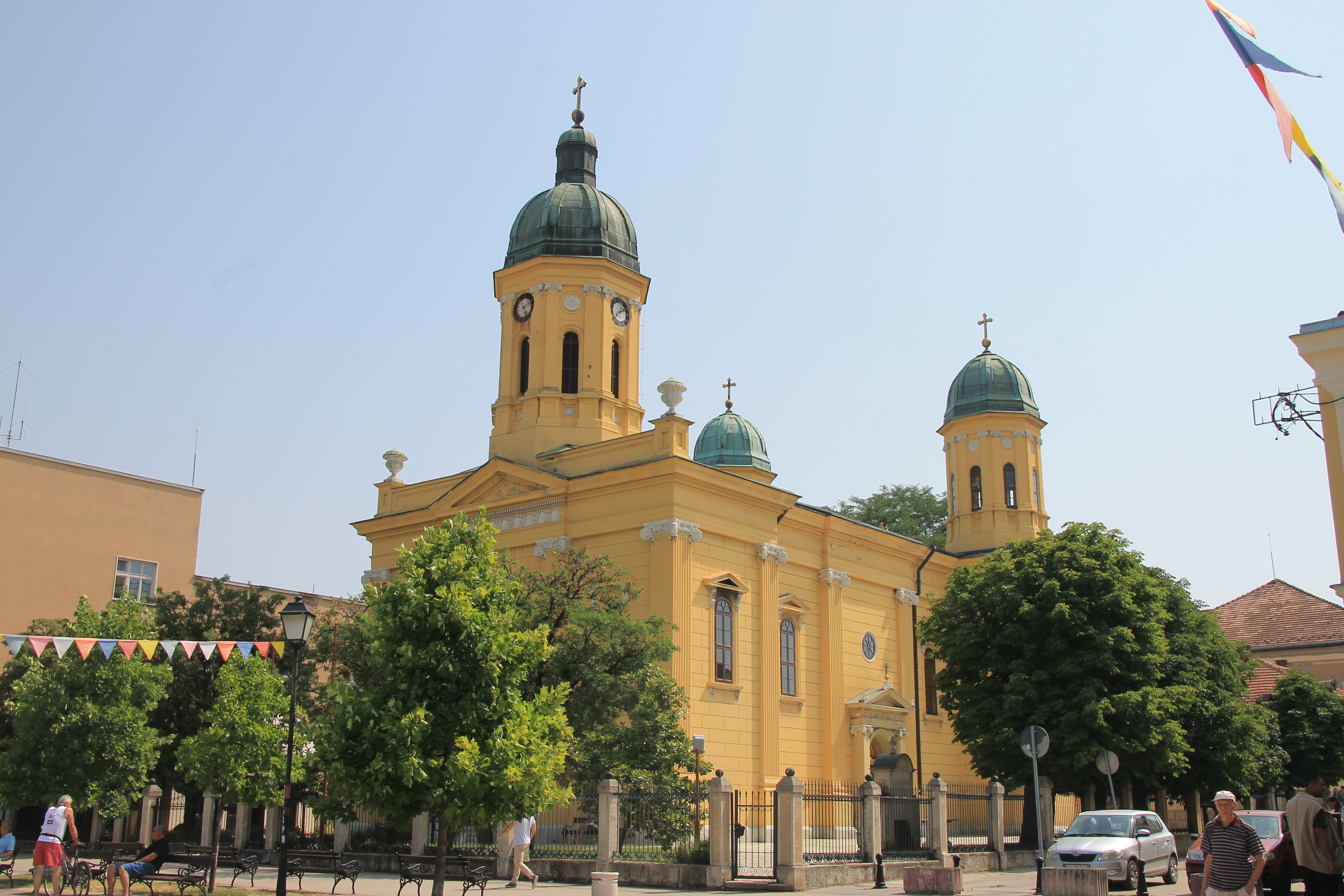
Negotin Cathedral

Until the formal declaration of independence in 1878, Negotin had achieved very much in a build-up of its position as a regional cultural, education and religious center. The first state school was opened in 1824, followed by a gymnasium in 1839. In time, the old Church of Our Lady became too small for the bishop of Negotin, so a grand new cathedral church was built in 1876.

At the same time, many Negotinians went to famous European universities, seeking education and enlightenment, e.g., Stevan Mokranjac, one of the five most important Serbian composers and Đorđe Stanojević, a physicist and an astronomer who later became University of Belgrade Rector.

Cultural life thrived, with many choral and other artistic societies. Most of the educational institutions had been opened in a matter of months after being opened in Belgrade (e.g., public library). In this period the idea of moving the town to the banks of the Danube first took a stronghold with the government and local officials. This has never happened, although other administrations have tried to do this. The town was simply too big for moving. Still, Negotin was not far from the Danube, only about 12 km, so river transportation was possible for its trade. However, the town's position had a serious disadvantage — it was very close to the Danube, but just a few metres above the level of the river at its highest, so it had always been surrounded by many swamps and ponds.

In the meantime, the town of Zaječar, being much closer to Niš and, therefore, to the rest of Serbia, was slowly taking over as a regional center. This advantage became much clearer especially with the construction of the railroad. Negotin was, though, more to the north and thus closer to Belgrade and the rest of Serbia, but those roads led through inaccessible mountain terrain, whereas it was much easier to go to the south, so Zaječar was, in terms of transport, much better off than Negotin. Until the beginning of the First World War, Zaječar had overtaken Negotin in terms of size and importance.

The two dynasties' vying for power, resulting with, in 1903, rebellious officers killing the king and queen of Serbia, Aleksandar Obrenović and Draga Mašin, had little impact on the fate of the town. The Balkan Wars of 1912–1913 didn't bring much to this area. However, units from this part of the country took part in almost all the battles of both wars, earning respect and glory.

=== World War I ===
On July 28, 1914, a former kind of ally that turned enemy, Austria-Hungary, declared war on Serbia. After initial successes by the Serbian armies, in the winter of 1915/16, the vastly outnumbered Serbia could no longer repel the attacks by the combined armies of Austria-Hungary, Germany and Bulgaria. But, instead of capitulating, the Serbian government chose to go into exile, with its army. Negotin was soon occupied and it remained so until the fall of 1918.

Negotin became a part of the newly formed Kingdom of the Serbs, Croats and Slovenes. From 1929 to 1941, Negotin was part of the Morava Banovina of the Kingdom of Yugoslavia.

=== Interbellum ===
The period between the two world wars was very much like the pre-war years. Negotin continued to lose on its size and importance; Zaječar was becoming the new regional center. Much of this was also happening due to poor environmental conditions in Negotin and its surroundings, as mentioned above. In the 1930s, the government and local officials started a huge irrigation project, aimed at getting rid of swamps around the town and gaining more agricultural land for the ever-growing population. As for industry, there had been some modest investments in the area, but the town itself remained strongly committed to its previous roles of trading center and preserving its old manufactures, many of which were now, quite obsolete. Still, there had been some progress and it was, unfortunately, stopped by World War Two in 1941.

=== World War II ===
As the war raged in Europe, the Kingdom of Yugoslavia had been spared, at least during the initial two years. Still, it hadn't done much to prepare for the inevitable, mostly because of unsettled national problems in the Kingdom. Therefore, as the German, Hungarian and Italian forces attacked on April 6, 1941, Yugoslavia simply fell apart after only two weeks of fighting. Many officers and soldiers, mostly from Serbia, had been taken prisoners of war and transported to the prisoner-of-war camps in Germany, Austria, Poland and as far as Norway. Although Negotin hadn't seen much of the fighting, in the summer of 1941, some guerilla resistance had been reported. Most of these "partisan" forces had been subsequently taken out of action during the summer and fall of 1941, with their fighters captured and killed. As for the remainder of the war, there hadn't been any major battles or atrocities recorded in the area. Just as the Germans easily and without resistance came in 1941, so did the Partisans and the Soviet troops, on their way to Belgrade and further. Negotin was liberated on September 12, 1944, after less than 3½ years of German occupation.

== Climate ==
Climate data for Negotin (1991–2020, extremes 1961–2020)
Month	Jan	Feb	Mar	Apr	May	Jun	Jul	Aug	Sep	Oct	Nov	Dec	Year
Record high °C (°F)	21.0 (69.8)	23.5 (74.3)	26.8 (80.2)	32.0 (89.6)	35.5 (95.9)	41.2 (106.2)	42.6 (108.7)	40.4 (104.7)	37.7 (99.9)	32.5 (90.5)	25.9 (78.6)	21.3 (70.3)	42.6 (108.7)
Mean daily maximum °C (°F)	4.2 (39.6)	6.9 (44.4)	12.8 (55.0)	18.7 (65.7)	23.9 (75.0)	28.0 (82.4)	30.4 (86.7)	30.5 (86.9)	24.8 (76.6)	17.8 (64.0)	10.3 (50.5)	4.7 (40.5)	17.8 (64.0)
Daily mean °C (°F)	0.6 (33.1)	2.5 (36.5)	7.3 (45.1)	12.9 (55.2)	18.1 (64.6)	22.2 (72.0)	24.1 (75.4)	23.7 (74.7)	18.1 (64.6)	12.1 (53.8)	6.3 (43.3)	1.4 (34.5)	12.4 (54.3)
Mean daily minimum °C (°F)	−2.9 (26.8)	−1.5 (29.3)	2.3 (36.1)	7.0 (44.6)	11.9 (53.4)	15.6 (60.1)	17.3 (63.1)	17.0 (62.6)	12.5 (54.5)	7.5 (45.5)	3.0 (37.4)	−1.7 (28.9)	7.3 (45.1)
Record low °C (°F)	−28.5 (−19.3)	−27.5 (−17.5)	−19.0 (−2.2)	−4.9 (23.2)	1.0 (33.8)	3.1 (37.6)	7.5 (45.5)	5.6 (42.1)	−3.6 (25.5)	−7.6 (18.3)	−13.7 (7.3)	−22.0 (−7.6)	−28.5 (−19.3)
Average precipitation mm (inches)	47.9 (1.89)	46.7 (1.84)	46.3 (1.82)	48.8 (1.92)	57.8 (2.28)	61.3 (2.41)	55.7 (2.19)	42.7 (1.68)	54.6 (2.15)	57.2 (2.25)	56.0 (2.20)	60.0 (2.36)	635.0 (25.00)
Average precipitation days (≥ 0.1 mm)	11.1	9.4	10.3	10.1	12.0	9.1	7.5	6.4	8.1	10.0	11.9	11.1	117.0
Average snowy days	7.1	5.1	2.7	0.1	0.0	0.0	0.0	0.0	0.0	0.2	2.1	5.0	22.3
Average relative humidity (%)	79.5	74.7	67.1	64.6	65.1	62.7	59.3	60.2	67.0	76.1	81.4	81.9	70.0
Mean monthly sunshine hours	80.3	104.3	158.2	200.7	250.0	290.2	323.3	300.5	213.5	144.0	72.9	62.7	2,200.6
Source: Republic Hydrometeorological Service of Serbia

== Settlements ==
Aside from the town of Negotin, the municipality includes the following settlements (population given in brackets):

- Aleksandrovac (588)
- Braćevac (533)
- Brestovac (355)
- Bukovče (1442)
- Crnomasnica (272)
- Čubra (557)
- Dupljane (564)
- Dušanovac (882)
- Jabukovac (1884)
- Jasenica (581)
- Karbulovo (520)
- Kobišnica (1355)
- Kovilovo (411)
- Mala Kamenica (392)
- Malajnica (683)
- Mihajlovac (718)
- Miloševo (517)
- Mokranje (710)
- Plavna (953)
- Popovica (487)
- Prahovo (1506)
- Radujevac (1540)
- Rajac (436)
- Rečka (469)
- Rogljevo (183)
- Samarinovac (464)
- Šarkamen (374)
- Sikole (838)
- Slatina (479)
- Smedovac (163)
- Srbovo (502)
- Štubik (939)
- Tamnič (349)
- Trnjane (479)
- Urovica (1191)
- Veljkovo (206)
- Vidrovac (822)
- Vratna (316)

== Demographics ==
Historical population
Year	Pop.	±% p.a.
1948	63,447	—
1953	64,358	+0.29%
1961	65,409	+0.20%
1971	63,706	−0.26%
1981	63,973	+0.04%
1991	59,559	−0.71%
2002	43,418	−2.83%
2011	37,056	−1.75%
2022	28,261	−2.43%

According to the 2011 census results, the municipality of Negotin has 37,056 inhabitants, of which 16,882 inhabitants live in the town of Negotin.

=== Ethnic groups ===
According to the 2011 census, most of the settlements in the Negotin municipality had Serb ethnic majority. The settlement with a Vlach ethnic majority is Kovilovo. An ethnically mixed settlement with relative Vlach majority is Aleksandrovac. Older census results show a higher share of Vlach population, but due to the Serbianisation process from the 20th century, their number dramatically decreased in favor of the Serbs. For example, the 1921 census counted 32,591 persons in the Negotin municipality, composed by 17,201 (53%) Vlachs; 15,340 (47%) Serbs and mixed families; and 50 others.

The ethnic composition of the municipality:

Ethnic group	Population 2011	%
Serbs	29,461	79.50%
Vlachs of Serbia (Vlachs)	3,382	9.13%
Romani	441	1.19%
Romanians (self-declared)	274	0.74%
Macedonians	73	0.20%
Bulgarians	61	0.16%
Montenegrins	50	0.13%
Croats	32	0.09%
Others	3,282	8.86%
Total	37,056	

== Economy ==
The population of the villages around Negotin are mostly supported by the family members who are guest workers in the countries of western Europe. The largest employer in this municipality is the chemical industry Prahovo, although this company, like many others in Serbia, is in very poor financial shape. Agriculture is a side activity more than an income-generating one. Muscat is a notable wine from Negotin.

The following table gives a preview of total number of registered people employed in legal entities per their core activity (as of 2024):

Activity	Total
Agriculture, forestry and fishing	104
Mining and quarrying	8
Manufacturing	1,578
Electricity, gas, steam and air conditioning supply	247
Water supply; sewerage, waste management and remediation activities	181
Construction	219
Wholesale and retail trade, repair of motor vehicles and motorcycles	1,206
Transportation and storage	308
Accommodation and food services	318
Information and communication	60
Financial and insurance activities	72
Real estate activities	7
Professional, scientific and technical activities	175
Administrative and support service activities	73
Public administration and defense; compulsory social security	599
Education	539
Human health and social work activities	708
Arts, entertainment and recreation	123
Other service activities	147
Individual agricultural workers	515
Total	7,188

== Culture and society ==
The Negotin museum is home to a number of archaeological findings, from Roman times to the World War II era. The Historical Archive of Negotin was established in 1952. The Negotin municipality is home to several galleries, monuments, churches and monasteries, and archaeological sites. The nearby Iron Gates national park has extensive views, hunting grounds, and hiking trails (some trails are not well marked or maintained, so hiking is recommended only for the experienced).

=== Mokranjčevi Dani ===
Annual musical celebration called Mokranjčevi Dani, after the Serbian composer Stevan Mokranjac, has been held in Negotin since 1966. Prominent performers appear at the festival, from Serbia and ex-republics of Yugoslavia, as well as world known pianists and choirs.

=== Education and public health ===
The town has one orphanage, one kindergarten and day care center, three elementary and four high schools, some of which are vocational. There is also an elementary school for children with handicaps.

The Negotin hospital offers all basic and many specialist services to this and neighboring municipalities.

== Notable personalities ==
Stevan Mokranjac the most famous Serbian composer of the 19th century was born and grew up in Negotin. His native house is a museum today.

Another notable Negotinian was Hajduk Veljko (aka Vojvoda Veljko Petrović), an early 19th-century freedom fighter. He was born in Lenovac near Zaječar to the south, but died defending Negotin from the Ottoman Turkish onslaught.

Đorđe Stanojević was a Serbian physicist, professor of applied physics and electricity, and researcher in these fields and colour photography. His statue is in the center of Negotin at the square that bears his name and there is one in Belgrade in front of Beograđanka, next to the headquarters of Serbia Electricity Co, which has also established an annual Đorđe Stanojević Award.

General Petar Živković was a minister and prime minister in several Kingdom of Serbia's and Kingdom of Yugoslavia's governments.

As a relatively young man, Vuk Karadžić was sent to Negotin by the leadership of the First Serbian Uprising to work as a clerk in the city magistrate and a scribe for Hajduk Veljko. That was the only salaried employment he held during his life.

Also born in Negotin were Ana Šomlo, the Serbian-Israeli writer, editor and translator; Jelena Tomašević, who represented Serbia in Eurovision Song Contest 2008; the Serbian-Canadian writer and scholar Miodrag Kojadinović; Bojan Aleksandrović, the priest who in 2004 built the Romanian Orthodox Church, Malajnica; and Dușan Pârvulovici, an activist for the minority rights of the Vlachs of Timok.

== Twin cities ==
Alghero

== See also ==
- Negotin Valley
