= Mission Greenwood–Rootham =

World War II Special Operations Executive Mission to Yugoslavia

Mission Greenwood–Rootham was a World War II Special Operations Executive (SOE) expedition to the Yugoslav Army in the Fatherland (Chetniks) in Homolje district of Eastern Serbia near the border with Romania. The group was led by Major Erik Greenwood, Major Jasper Rootham and included Sergeant W. Anderson (W/T), Sergeant C. E. Hall (RAF) (W/T), Lieutenant E. "Micky" Hargreaves and a Royal Yugoslav Army (RYA) officer code-named "Arlo".

== Purpose ==
While Operation Bullseye delivered permanent British presence at Chetniks' headquarters of Colonel Draža Mihailović, this expedition was a sub-mission to his regional headquarters. In this case, to a strategically important location, able to monitor and disrupt shipping on Danube (transporting Romanian oil crucial for the war effort), Belgrade–Salonika railway (used for supply of German troops in North Africa) and Bor copper mines—the largest in Europe.

The objects were: to collect intelligence about Axis military dispositions and to encourage and promote resistance among the guerrillas, particularly in the way of sabotage of lines of communication and industrial facilities working for the enemy. We were British officers, sent in accordance with the British war policy and supporting to the best of our ability anybody who was against the axis and was prepared to show it by deeds.

== Arrival and initial activities ==
The group arrived in two separate trips. Greenwood, Anderson and "Arlo" flew from Derna airfield and were parachuted in mid-April 1943. Due to bad weather, Rootham, Hall and Hargreaves abandoned the first two attempts and were finally successful on 21 May, landing at Homolje Mountains.

British ambition for chetniks' engagement was in the acts of sabotage and undermining German war efforts. The strategy meant that they would be supplied with explosives, medical equipment and similar, while they were asking for light-machine guns and ammunition, boots, uniforms and wireless accessories. The discrepancy of intentions between two allied armies became obvious very early in the engagement and grew ever-wider.

In the following few weeks, the mission visited local commanders in the region, passing through Vlaole and Gornjane. On 31 May, en route to Deli Jovan, they encountered a young wireless enthusiast who made the very first radio contact between Mihailović and the British naval monitoring station in Malta in August 1941, thus starting the chain of events.

Throughout the period, the lack of four-engine long-range aircraft and trained crew, unpredictable weather over the Mediterranean, general bureaucracy and feeling of a 'side-show' meant that flights were fewer and cargo continued to consist of explosive and medical supplies, rather than small arms and ammunition. This raised suspicions of the hosts and frustration of the visitors.

On 15 June, three additional soldiers were parachuted. David Russell and his W/T operator Nicolae Turcanu who had a mission to get to Romania (Operation Ranji) as well as a Polish army officer called "Nash," who was to engage with Polish POWs escaped from the Bor mines.

== Summer ==
On 26 June, Rootham observed German-uniformed Slovak soldiers attack the village of Rudna Glava, and saw civilians fleeing across the fields with their life belongings and livestock. The local Serb commander asked him to report to the BBC that 150 civilians were killed. Rootham disputed the number, and the officer reduced it to seventy. Later that year, when passing through the village itself, Rootham had asked about the number of casualties in the incident and was told that five people were killed then.

Mihailovich's commanders, by overplaying what was good in their hand and by trying to cover up what was weak, sapped the confidence in them of those British officers who were the sole impartial interpreters of their cause to the outside world ... we felt the concern at the exaggerations and pomposity, as well as in some cases the incompetence and lack of team spirit.

Shortly afterwards, he also realised that instead of engaging German or Bulgarian troops, local chetnik commander was fighting the partisans. Rootham considered this a clear violation of the agreement and stated that "the arms which we supplied were to be used for fighting the Germans and not for keeping in cold storage or for civil war".

== Autumn and winter ==
On 21 August, while waiting for an aircraft drop, the group came very near German soldiers spending the night in Crnajka. Chetnik commander had over 60 troops at his disposal and could have ambushed them but decided to withdraw instead. On 26 August, Germans set houses in Crnajka on fire as they were leaving. Rootham was upset that the enemy was let go unscathed, while their host, obeying his High Command, failed to engage and was fearful of reprisals.

Later that day, the mission reached Leskovo for a pre-arranged conference with local commanders. They spoke openly criticizing their hosts' state of training of the troops, poor attention to their weapons as well as lack of discipline under fire or the threat of fire. They asked about Mihailović's plan for Eastern Serbia and demanded an immediate start of sabotage, stating that their rule was "No action, No support". To make matters worse, they quoted the Allied Command HQ telegrams stating that the partisans had been co-operative and had carried out actions. Chetnik commanders bitterly disagreed, claiming the lack of arms, as well as fear that Britain was willing to hand over the Balkans to Russia. Finally, they mentioned that they considered Allied Command instructions to be "requests" and not "orders".

Regardless of the disagreements, the cargo and reinforcements continued to arrive and Lieutenant Hargreaves acquired his own W/T operator called Ridewood. The following month, as the Italians surrendered, new commander, Brigadier C. D. Armstrong had been appointed to Mihailović's HQ. On 20 September, new reinforcements Captain Patterson, Captain Vercoe, and Sergeant Scott were dropped. Patterson landed without a hitch, but both Vercoe and Scott fell in trees and were heavily injured, unable to walk.

On 15 October, in order to try to sabotage the Bor copper mines, SOE headquarters sent 48-year-old Major Scorgie, a mining-engineer who was hoping to work with someone 'inside'. The ground attack did not go ahead mainly due to the RAF not being able to provide airplanes for the simultaneous diversionary air-raid.

== Disruption of Danube shipping ==
On 22 October, Rootham, Greenwood and Scorgie left Gornjane and picked up a former Danube pilot to act as a technical adviser on their way to the river. The plan was to fire a 20-mm anti-tank gun and sink a tug-boat. The gun had 12 rounds of ammunition but no telescopic sights. They reached Boljetin and started the operation on 26 October around 09:15, by shooting at an approaching German tug-boat "Centaur". They did not sink the tug-boat but managed to hit it and disrupt the shipping lane for some time. The German propaganda leaflets denied this and stated that 150 of Mihailović's supporters in Belgrade were shot on 28 October, as a reprisal for this and for the two German soldiers killed near Kladovo earlier in the month. In spite of the awful consequences, Rootham saw the importance of the action.

I am convinced that if a number of such attacks had been made, over a period of time, along the stretch of the Danube between Golubac and Turnu Severin, the Germans would, militarily, have found it almost impossible to stop them without using a disproportionately large number of troops, and there is no doubt that the effect on the Danube traffic would have been, to say the least, clogging.

== The disappointment and withdrawal ==
In January 1944, the group had attempted to blow up the main railway bridge over the Morava river, south of Stalać. Another railway bridge over the Ibar river was to be destroyed on the same day, thus paralyzing the north–south railway traffic in Serbia. General Mihailović was to issue the order for both attacks. In spite of frantic signals sent to Mihailović's HQ for the permission to carry out the plan, the order never came, damaging the morale of the group.

On 2 March, the mission received the telegram that the decision had been taken to evacuate all the British men and officers at present with Mihailović and to move towards Brig Armstrong's HQ in Western Serbia. They were not surprised, as few weeks previously, Rootham noted:

The truth as we see it is that the Serbs are fundamentally and spiritually on our side; but that through the lack of vision of Mihailovic, whom we built up into a national leader, they have lost sight of the prime fact that there is only one war, and have allowed their own problems to bulk larger than the main one. In doing this they have lost our support and what the future will be it is hard to say. It will need something precious near a miracle to save it.

During this time, Lieutenant Hargreaves was captured by a small detachment of German ex-Afrika Corps. They delivered him to the Gestapo jail in Belgrade, beat him, took away his clothes and led him out six times to watch executions, not knowing whether he would be next. There, he saw hundreds of civilians shot which confirmed that stories of reprisals were not all invented by the Serbs. Capt Vercoe, still unable to walk, was captured near Gornja Mutnica on 24 March. Both men ended up in the notorious Oflag IV-C (Colditz Castle). Vercoe was repatriated in January 1945. while Hargreaves was freed by the American troops in April 1945.

As they were preparing to leave, the group came under attack by soldiers of the 25th Bulgarian Division near Žagubica when local chetnik commander came to their rescue:

He knew that we were being evacuated, that we were ordered to leave him and those who thought as he did, and that he had nothing to expect from us. He went out at the head of his men to cover our retreat. It is perhaps unwise to argue from the particular to the general, but we cannot forget that it was the so-called collaborationist organisation of Mihailovich which, with less than no inducement and no motive but honour and chivalry, saved us British in Eastern Serbia on March 28th 1944.

The group received orders to join Brigadier Armstrong on 6 April 1944 and moved towards Čačak, spending a night at Kalenić monastery. On 16 April, they observed formations of B-17s and B-24s, flying north towards Belgrade. The heavy bombardment of the city on Orthodox Easter Sunday caused many civilian casualties and damaged the reputation and support for the Allies. A day later, the mission met up with Gen Draža Mihailović, whom Rootham found modest and conscientious, but also "desperately tired, sad and worried man".

On 29 May, Rootham said goodbye to Mihailović, as well as Živko Topalović and Stevan Moljević, and the following night was air-lifted to Bari. The next day he was joined by Erik Greenwood, which marked the end of their mission.

== Sources ==
- Deakin, F. (2011). The Embattled Mountain. London: Faber and Faber Ltd. ISBN 9780571276448.
- Rootham, J. (1946). Miss Fire. London: Chatto & Windus.
- Williams, H. (2003). Parachutes, Patriots, and Partisans. London: C. Hurst & Co. ISBN 1850655928.
