= Izačić =

Izačić Изачић
- Village
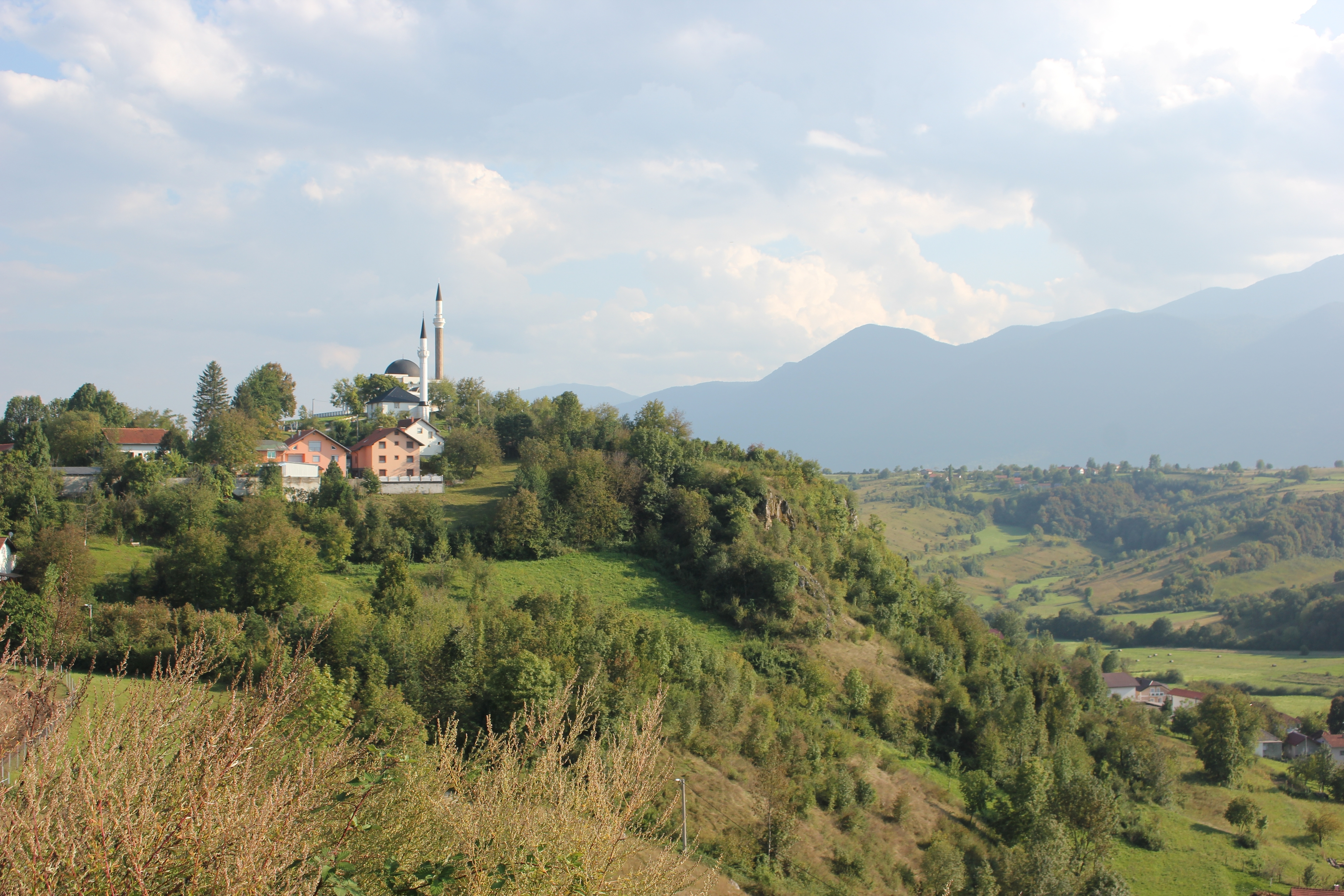
- Panorama of Izačić

- Location within Bosnia and Herzegovina
- Coordinates: 44°52′N 15°47′E
- Country: Bosnia and Herzegovina
- Entity: Federation of Bosnia and Herzegovina
- Canton: Una-Sana
- Municipality: Bihać

Area
  - Total: 2.24 sq mi (5.80 km^{2})
- Elevation: 775.5 ft (236.38 m)

Population
  - Total: 4,089
  - Density: 1,830/sq mi (705/km^{2})
- Time zone: UTC+1 (CET)
  - Summer (DST): UTC+2 (CEST)

Izačić (Serbian Cyrillic: Изачић) is a small village in Bosnia and Herzegovina with an estimated population of 4,089 people, roughly 0.12% of the entire population as of 2024, and an area of 5,8 km^{2}.

== Geography ==
Izačić is a part of the region "Federation of Bosnia and Herzegovina" within Bosnia and Herzegovina. It is located roughly 3 km (1.9 mi) east of the border with Croatia. The eastern region lies mainly in a valley between a hill, with a sub-village called Mušići, below Mount Plješevica and Prtošanj hill. A small river flows from east to west, originating from the river Mrežnica, near the town of Klokot. The area is defined by many natural water sources. The southern part is mainly flat.

The village is most famous for being the site of Operation Tiger in 1994.
