= Klokotnitsa =

Klokotnitsa (Bulgarian: Клокотница; also transliterated Klokotnica) may refer to:

- Klokotnitsa, Haskovo Province, a village in Bulgaria
  - Battle of Klokotnitsa, 1230
- Klokotnitsa Ridge

== See also ==
- Klokotnica (disambiguation) (Клокотница)
- Klokot (disambiguation)
- Klokočevac (disambiguation)
