= Klokočevac =

Klokočevac may refer to:

- Klokočevac, a village near Majdanpek, Serbia
- Klokočevac, a village near Bjelovar, Croatia

or:

- Ilovski Klokočevac, a village near Hercegovac, Croatia

== See also ==
- Klokot (disambiguation)
- Klokotnica (disambiguation)
