= Topolnica, Majdanpek =

Topolnica Тополница
- Village
- Location within Serbia
- Coordinates: 44°23′26″N 22°10′18″E
- Country: Serbia
- District: Bor District
- Municipality: Majdanpek

Population (2002)
  - Total: 1,064
- Time zone: UTC+1 (CET)
  - Summer (DST): UTC+2 (CEST)

Topolnica (Serbian Cyrillic: Тополница) is a village in Serbia. It is situated in the Majdanpek municipality, in the Bor District. The nearest town is Donji Milanovac. The village has a Serb ethnic majority and its population numbering 1,064 people (2002 census).
