= Mosna (Majdanpek) =

Mosna Мосна
- Village
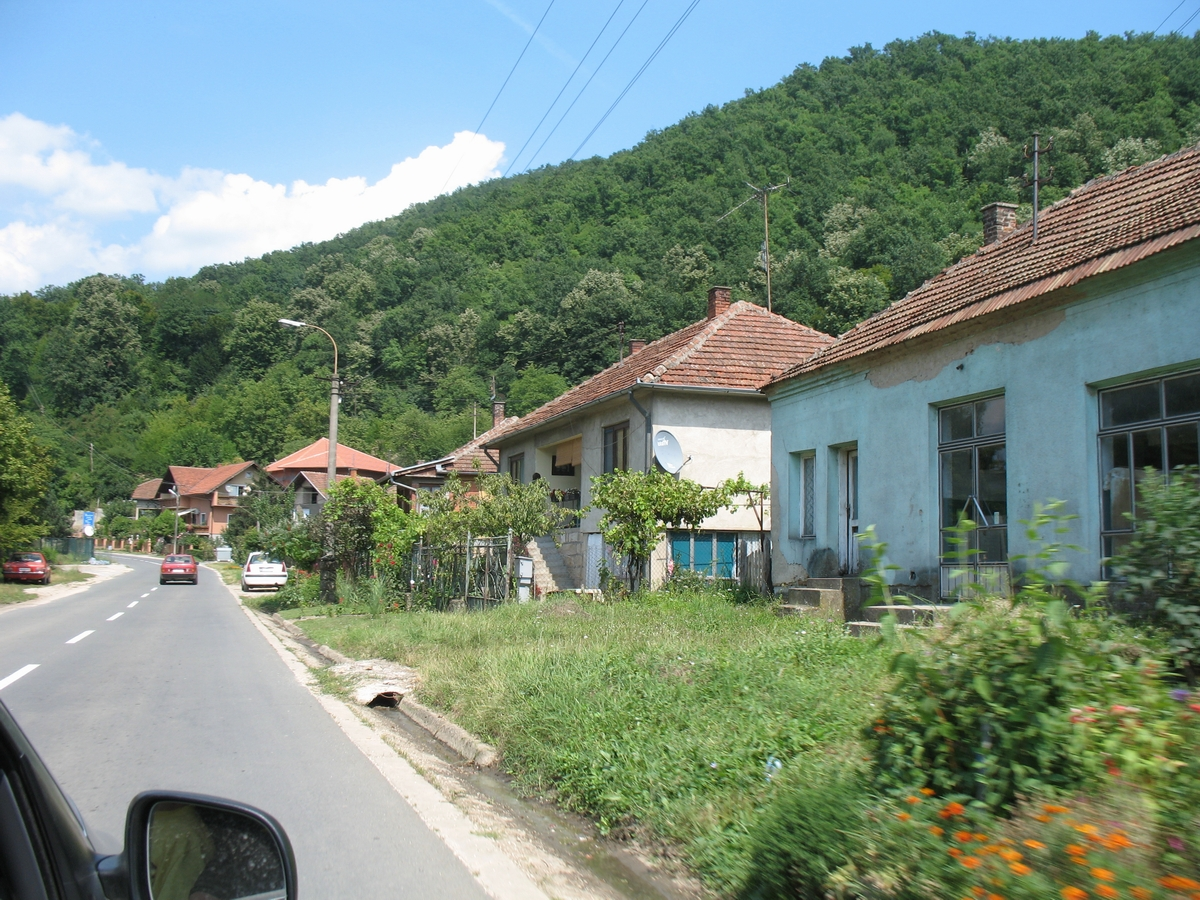

- Location within Serbia
- Coordinates: 44°26′49″N 22°10′50″E
- Country: Serbia
- District: Bor District
- Municipality: Majdanpek

Population (2002)
  - Total: 787
- Time zone: UTC+1 (CET)
  - Summer (DST): UTC+2 (CEST)
- Postal code: 19220
- Area code: +381 30

Mosna (Serbian Cyrillic: Мосна) is a village in Serbia. It is situated in the Majdanpek municipality, in the Bor District. The nearest town is Donji Milanovac. The village has a Serb ethnic majority and its population numbering 787 people (2002 census).

== History ==
The first known settlement in the area of Mosna dates to the Iron Age, when a settlement called Mrfaia was attested on the left bank of the Porečka River, 1.5 kilometers from its confluence with the Danube.

The name Mosna was first time mentioned in 1730 (during the Austrian occupation of Serbia 1718-1739). The village then had 11 houses and was populated by Timok Romanians (referred to in Serbian as "Vlachs"). The settlement was probably founded earlier and omitted from the unsystematic censuses carried out under Turkish rule. Mosna's first inhabitants were likely from the Negotin Valley, later supplemented by "refugees from Wallachia".

In 1970 the village was relocated 2 km up the Porečka River as part of the construction of the Iron Gate I Hydro Power Plant in 1970.

== Demographics ==
As of the 2002 census, Mosna housed 610 adult inhabitants with an average age of 39.3 years (38.0 male and 40.6 female). The village encompasses 268 households with 2.94 inhabitants per household. The majority ethnic population in the settlement is Serbs.
