= Golubinje =

Golubinje ili Kolumbina
- Village
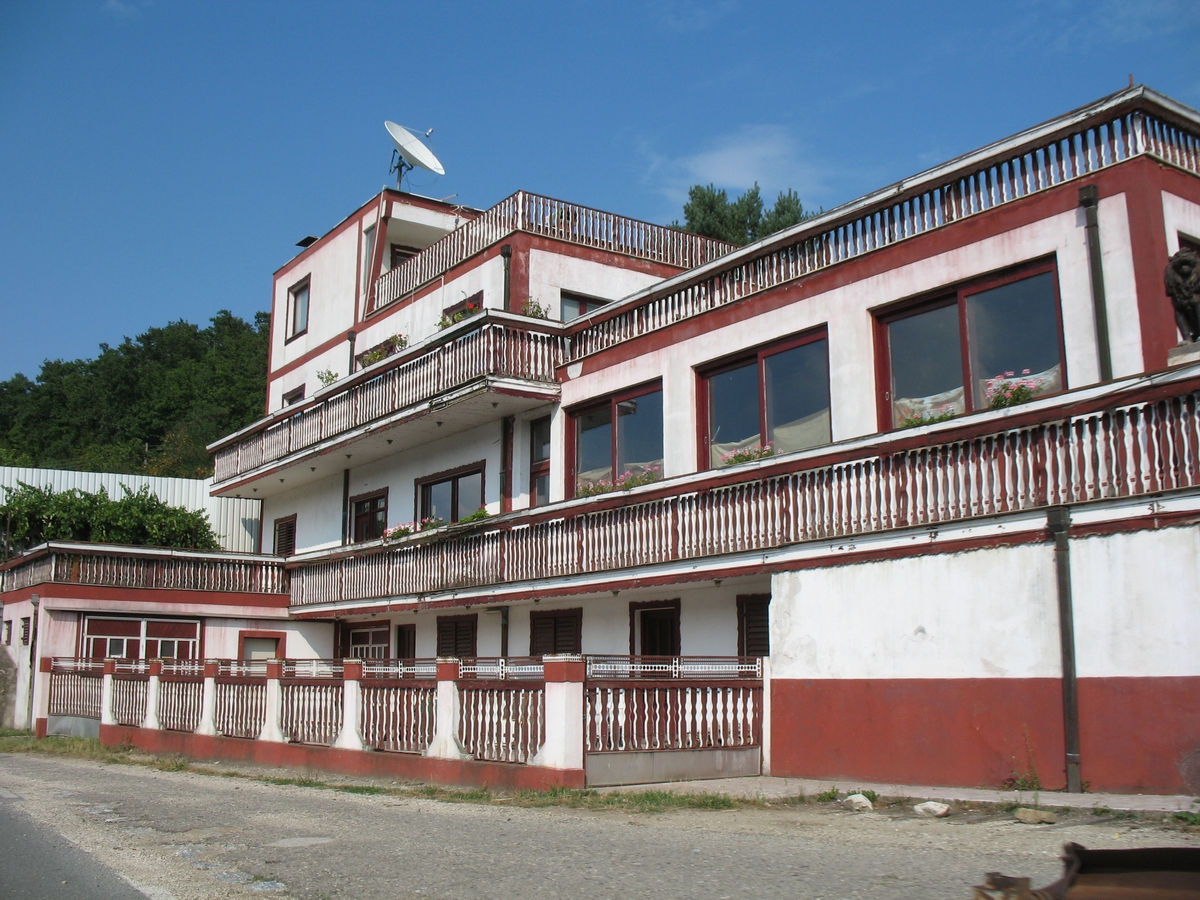

- Location within Serbia
- Coordinates: 44°30′N 22°12′E
- Country: Serbia
- District: Bor District
- Municipality: Majdanpek
- Elevation: 781 ft (238 m)

Population (2002)
  - Total: 1,079
- Time zone: UTC+1 (CET)
  - Summer (DST): UTC+2 (CEST)

Golubinje is a village in the municipality of Majdanpek, Serbia. According to the 2002 census, the village has a population of 1,079 people.
