= Jasikovo =

- Village
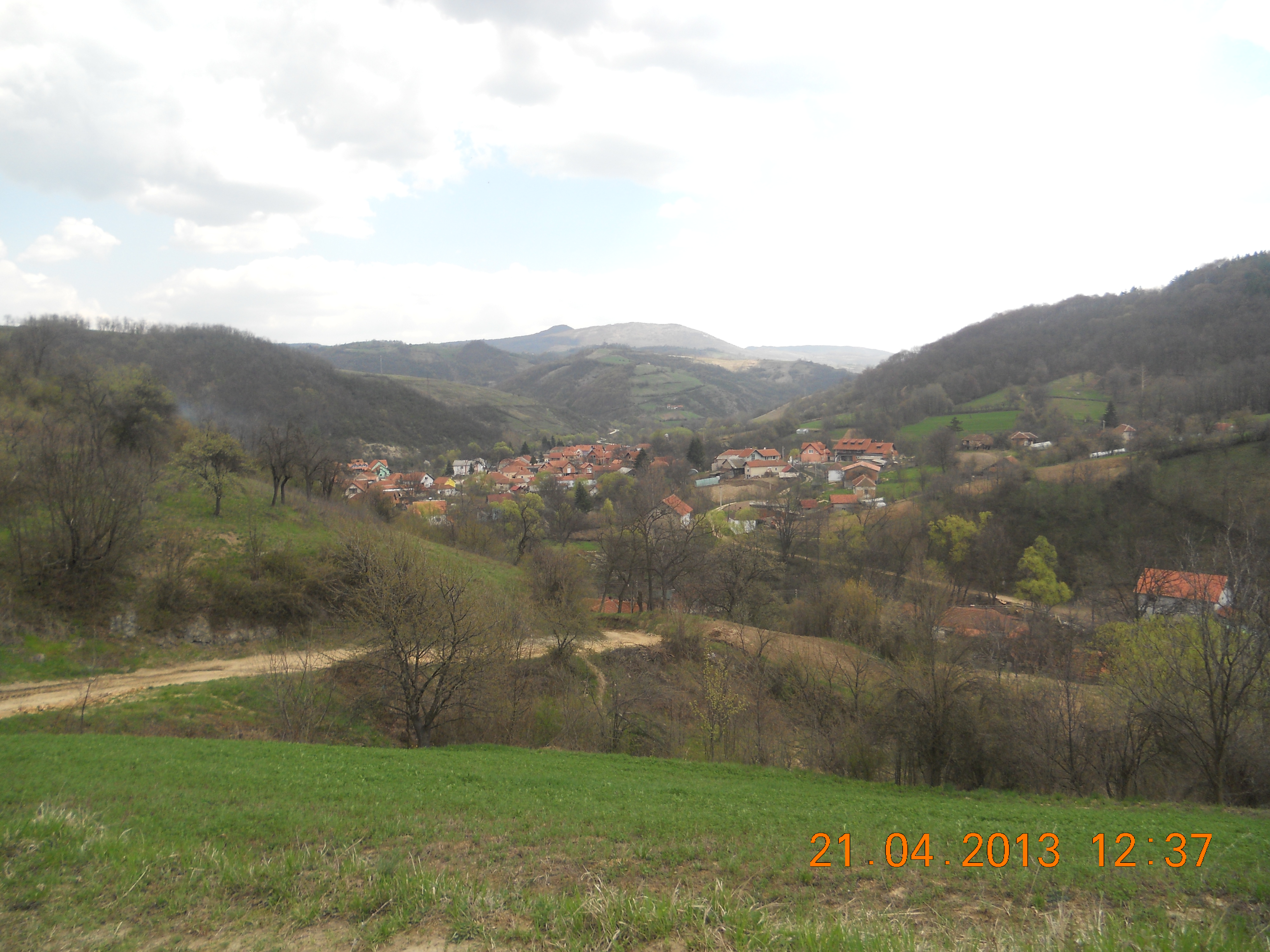
- Jasikovo

- Location within Serbia
- Country: Serbia
- District: Bor District
- Municipality: Majdanpek

Population (2002)
  - Total: 717
- Time zone: UTC+1 (CET)
  - Summer (DST): UTC+2 (CEST)
- Website: www.jasikovo.com

Jasikovo is a village in the municipality of Majdanpek, Serbia. According to the 2002 census, the village has a population of 717 people.

== History ==
Some data on the age of the settlement can be found in Antonio Lazić work (Settlement and development of settlements in central and upper Pek), which are based on the notes of Dr. Bartol Kunibert, who described the first Serbian Uprising and the first reign of Prince Miloš Obrenović. In his records, Lazić states: Jasikovo lies at the mouth of the Jagnjilo in Veliki Pek. Administratively it belongs to Homolj and economically it is referred to Žagubica. The village is of older origin and was deserted in the seventeenth century, as are many Homolje villages. We find it as a deserted place in 1723. In 1818 the settlement was repopulated and had about 15 homes. Near the settlement, upstream of the river Lipa, where the river Božina flows into Lipa, there are traces of old Roman works on washing gold and various tools. This gives enough evidence to claim that there was a settlement in this place in Roman times.

Knowing that the Habsburg army ravaged and plundered this area in 1690. during the Great Turkish War, when the settlement of Medeni Pek (today's Majdanpek) was completely destroyed, it is possible that the surrounding villages were displaced in that period.

Today's Jasikovo belongs to the municipality of Majdanpek. It has an area of about 3493 ha. and about 800 inhabitants, which is demographically declining compared to previous periods. With the development of technology and research of the surrounding locations, it has been discovered that they are rich in certain mineral wealth, including gold, which was proved too by the ancient Romans many centuries ago. This led the current government of the Republic of Serbia to start pit works on Choka Marin in the Jasikovac area, in addition to the Bor, Majdanpek, Krivelj and Cerovo excavations. The practice from previous years shows a great exploitation of mineral wealth in the municipality of Majdanpek itself. Of that, little has been invested in the infrastructure of the Municipality of Majdanpek, but also in sustainable development.

During the Balkan Wars, then during the First and Second World Wars, a large part of the male population of Jasikovo was recruited, and even participated in the breakthrough of the Macedonian front. A monument to fallen heroes was erected in Jasikovo, which still stands today.

== Demographics ==
As of 2022, the village was home to 478 people. Of the 333 who have a stated ethnicity, 60.66% identify as Serbs and 37.24% identify as Vlachs.
