= Suzana Šuvaković Savić =

- Born: 13 January 1969; Majdanpek, Serbia (Yugoslavia)
- Died: 18 October 2016 (aged 47); Belgrade, Serbia
- Occupation: Opera singer soprano

Suzana Šuvaković Savić (13 January 1969 – 18 October 2016) was a Serbian operatic soprano who has had an active career as a member of the National Theatre in Belgrade.

== Career ==
Born in Majdanpek, Suzana became a member of the National Theatre in Belgrade while she was a student.

She died from cancer at the age of 47.The artist's memorial service and burial at the Lešće Cemetery took place on 21 October 2016.
