= Debeli Lug (Majdanpek) =

Debeli Lug Дебели Луг Dăbi Liug
- Village
- Location within Serbia
- Country: Serbia
- District: Bor District
- Municipality: Majdanpek

Population (2022)
  - Total: 326
- Time zone: UTC+1 (CET)
  - Summer (DST): UTC+2 (CEST)

Debeli Lug (Serbian: Дебели Луг; Romanian: Dăbi Liug) is a village in the municipality of Majdanpek, Serbia. It has a population of 326 inhabitants (2022 census), a plurality of them Vlachs.
