= Miroč (Majdanpek) =

Miroč Мироч
- Village
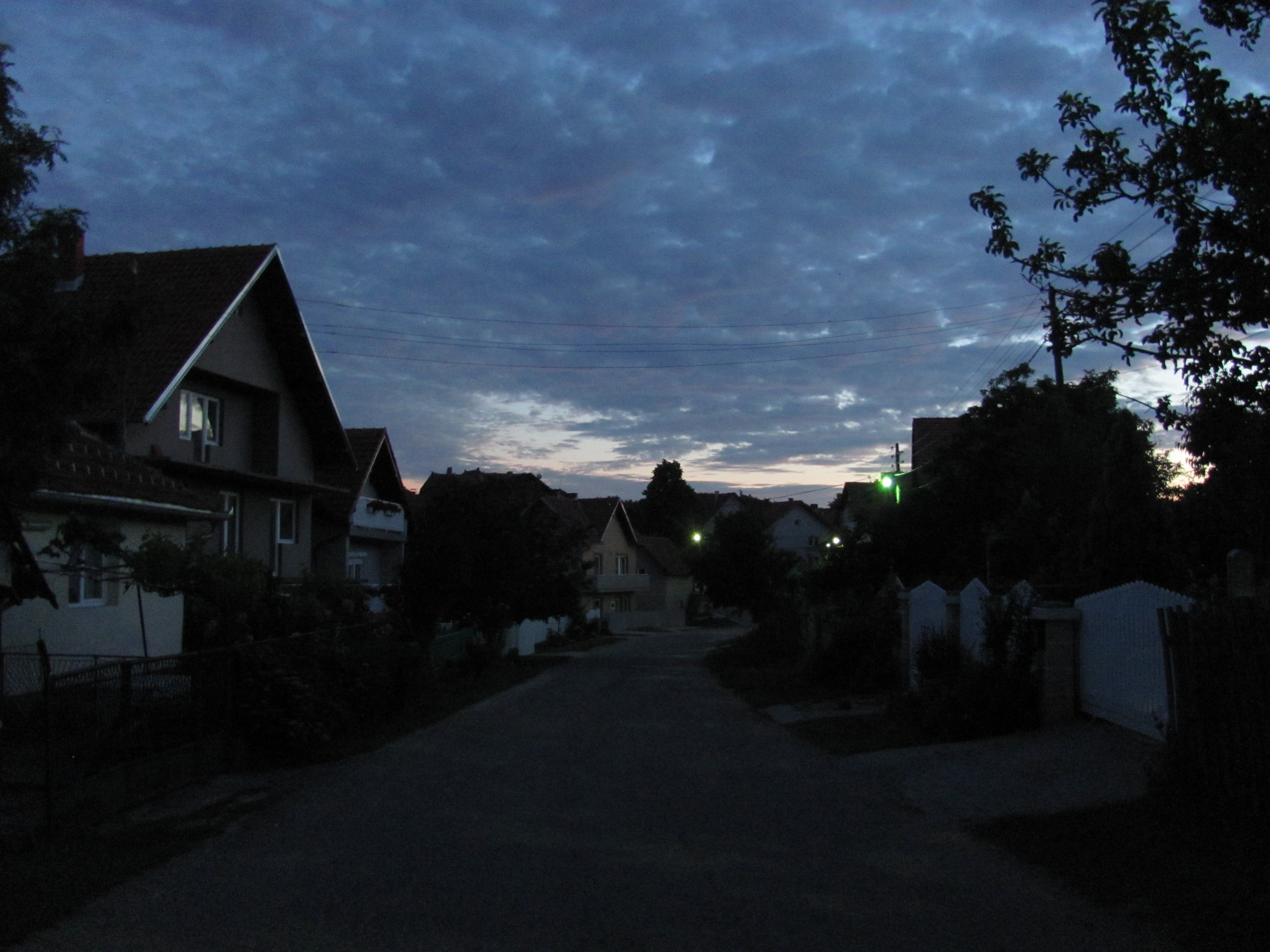
- Miroč at night

- Location within Serbia
- Coordinates: 44°28′38″N 22°15′00″E
- Country: Serbia
- District: Bor District
- Municipality: Majdanpek

Population (2002)
  - Total: 406
- Time zone: UTC+1 (CET)
  - Summer (DST): UTC+2 (CEST)

Miroč is a village in the municipality of Majdanpek, Serbia. According to the 2002 census, the village has a population of 406 people.
