= Vlaole =

Vlaole Влаоле Vlaole Mare
- Village
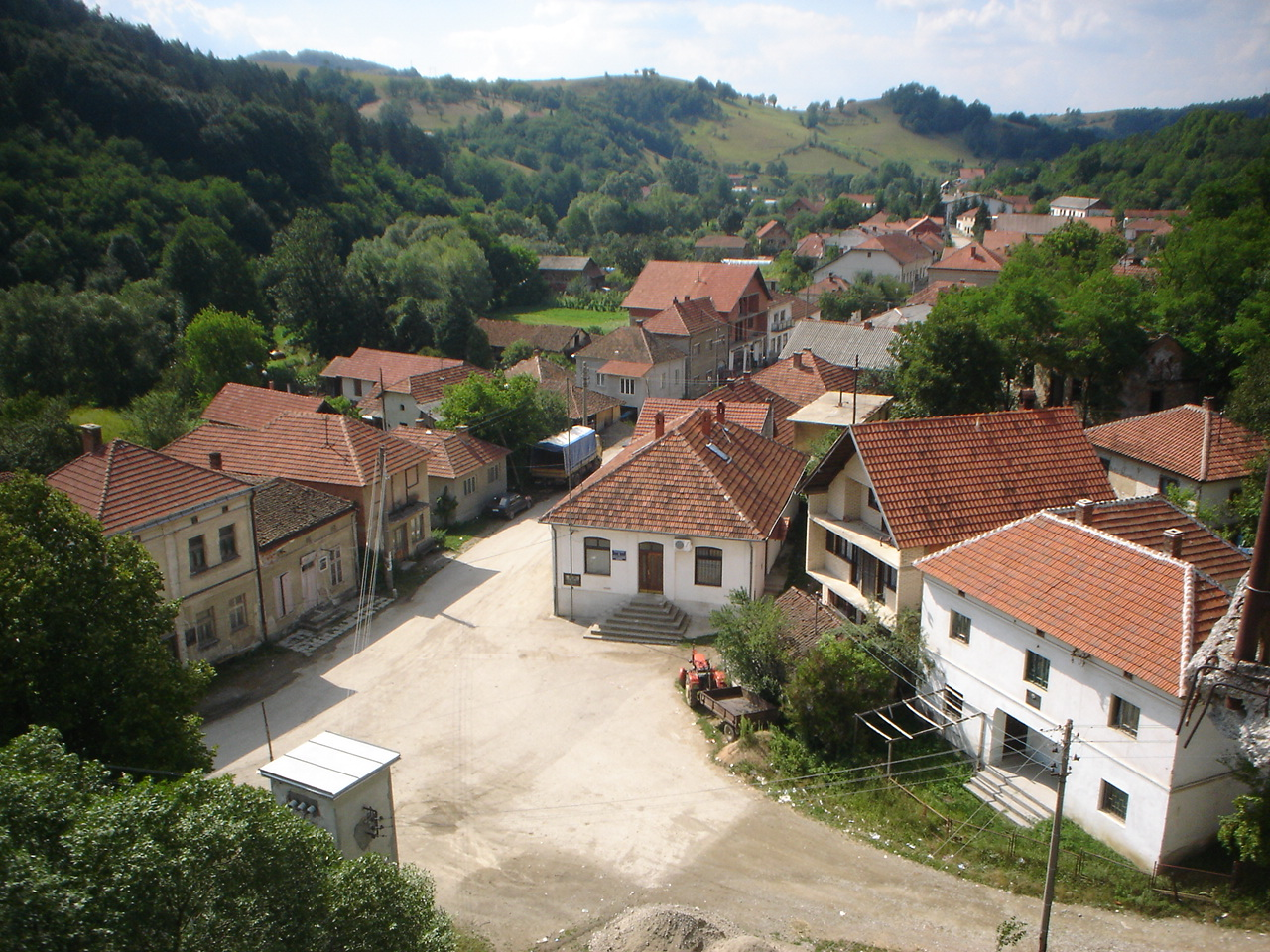

- Location within Serbia
- Coordinates: 44°16′N 21°59′E
- Country: Serbia
- District: Bor District
- Municipality: Majdanpek

Population (2022)
  - Total: 444
- Time zone: UTC+1 (CET)
  - Summer (DST): UTC+2 (CEST)

Vlaole (Serbian: Влаоле; Romanian: Vlaole Mare) is a village in the municipality of Majdanpek, Serbia. It has a population of 444 inhabitants (2022 census), a plurality of them Vlachs.
