= Rudna Glava =

Village and mining site in Serbia

- Village
- Location within Serbia
- Country: Serbia
- District: Bor District
- Municipality: Majdanpek
- Time zone: UTC+1 (CET)
  - Summer (DST): UTC+2 (CEST)

Rudna Glava (lit. 'Ore Head') is a mining site in present-day eastern Serbia, a village and an archeological site.

The site, located northwest of the present-day village, on the left bank of the Šaška, demonstrates one of the earliest evidences of European copper mining and metallurgy, dating to the 5th millennium BC. Shafts were cut into the hillside, with scaffolding constructed for easy access to the veins of ore. It belongs to the Vinča culture, as is shown by pottery-finds. In 1983, Rudna Glava was added to the Archaeological Sites of Exceptional Importance list, protected by Republic of Serbia.

== See also ==
- Archaeological Sites of Exceptional Importance

== Sources and external links ==
- Borislav Jovanović, Rudna Glava, najstarije rudarstvo bakra na centralnom Balkanu. Bor, Muzej rudarstva i metallurgije/Beograd, Arheološki institut 1982.
- J. P. Mallory and Martin E. Huld, "Metal", Encyclopedia of Indo-European Culture, Fitzroy Dearborn, 1997.
- http://www.komunikacija.org.rs/komunikacija/casopisi/starinar/XLIX_*ns/d16/document
- Archeology - Archaeometallurgy
- History of Mining
- History of Metallurgy
