= Klokotnica =

Klokotnica (Cyrillic: Клокотница) may refer to:

- Klokotnica (Doboj Istok), a village in Bosnia and Herzegovina

== See also ==
- Klokotnitsa (disambiguation) (Клокотница)
- Klokot (disambiguation)
- Klokočevac (disambiguation)
