= Boljetin =

Boljetin Бољетин
- Village
- Location within Serbia
- Coordinates: 44°31′30″N 22°1′52″E
- Country: Serbia
- District: Bor District
- Municipality: Majdanpek

Population (2002)
  - Total: 672
- Time zone: UTC+1 (CET)
  - Summer (DST): UTC+2 (CEST)

Boljetin (Serbian Cyrillic: Бољетин) is a village in the municipality of Majdanpek, Serbia. According to the 2002 census, the village has a population of 672 people.
