= Klokočevac (Majdanpek) =

- Village
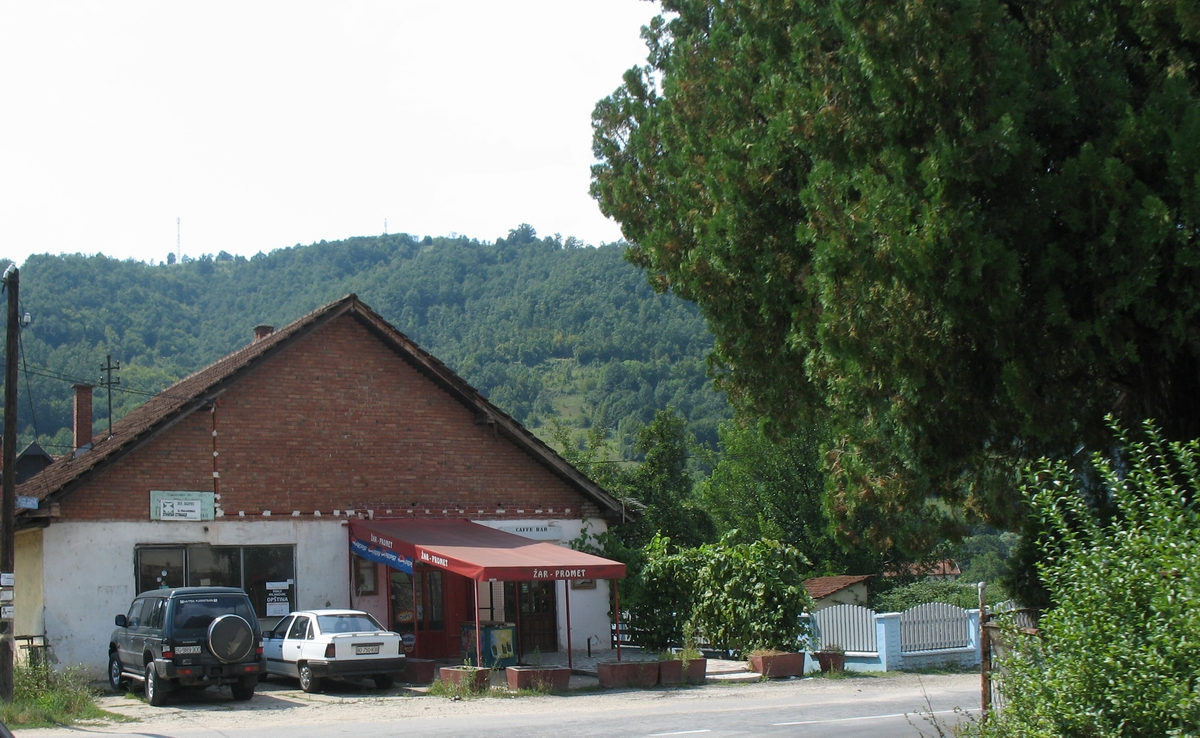
- Street of Klokočevac

- Location within Serbia
- Country: Serbia
- District: Bor District
- Municipality: Majdanpek

Population (2002)
  - Total: 711
- Time zone: UTC+1 (CET)
  - Summer (DST): UTC+2 (CEST)

Klokočevac is a village in the municipality of Majdanpek, Serbia. According to the 2002 census, the village has a population of 711 people.
