= Leskovo (Majdanpek) =

Leskovo Лесково Lescovo
- Village
- Location within Serbia
- Coordinates: 44°19′N 21°57′E
- Country: Serbia
- District: Bor District
- Municipality: Majdanpek

Area
  - Total: 10.72 sq mi (27.76 km^{2})

Population (2022)
  - Total: 185
  - Density: 17.26/sq mi (6.665/km^{2})
- Time zone: UTC+1 (CET)
  - Summer (DST): UTC+2 (CEST)

Leskovo (Serbian: Лесково; Romanian: Lescovo) is a village in the municipality of Majdanpek, Serbia. According to the 2022 census, the village has a population of 185 people, a plurality of them Vlachs.
