= Klokot (disambiguation) =

Klokot may refer to:

- Klokot
- Klokot, Bihać, a village in the municipality of Bihać, Bosnia and Herzegovina
- Klokot (river), left tributary of the Una in Bosnia and Herzegovina

== See also ==
- Klokotnica (disambiguation)
- Klokočevac (disambiguation)
