= Crnajka =

- Village
- Location within Serbia
- Country: Serbia
- District: Bor District
- Municipality: Majdanpek

Population (2002)
  - Total: 1,099
- Time zone: UTC+1 (CET)
  - Summer (DST): UTC+2 (CEST)

Crnajka is a village in the municipality of Majdanpek, Serbia. According to the 2002 census, the village has a population of 1099 people.
