= Mušići =

Coordinates: 43°59′N 20°3′E

- Village
- Interactive map of Mušići
- Country: Serbia
- District: Zlatibor District
- Municipality: Kosjerić

Population (2002)
  - Total: 433
- Time zone: UTC+1 (CET)
  - Summer (DST): UTC+2 (CEST)

Mušići is a village in the municipality of Kosjerić, western Serbia. According to the 2002 census, the village has a population of 433 people.
