= Klokot, Bihać =

Klokot Клокот
- Village
- Location within Bosnia and Herzegovina
- Coordinates: 44.8356°N 15.8100°E
- Country: Bosnia and Herzegovina
- Entity: Federation of Bosnia and Herzegovina
- Canton: Una-Sana
- Municipality: Bihać

Area
  - Total: 1.68 sq mi (4.34 km^{2})

Population (2013)
  - Total: 559
  - Density: 334/sq mi (129/km^{2})
- Time zone: UTC+1 (CET)
  - Summer (DST): UTC+2 (CEST)

Klokot (Serbian Cyrillic: Клокот) is a village in the municipality of Bihać, Bosnia and Herzegovina.

== Demographics ==
According to the 2013 census, its population was 559.

Ethnicity in 2013
Ethnicity	Number	Percentage
Bosniaks	545	97.5%
Croats	1	0.2%
other/undeclared	13	2.3%
Total	559	100%
