= Majdanpek =

Majdanpek Мајданпек (Serbian) Maidan (Romanian)
- Town and municipality
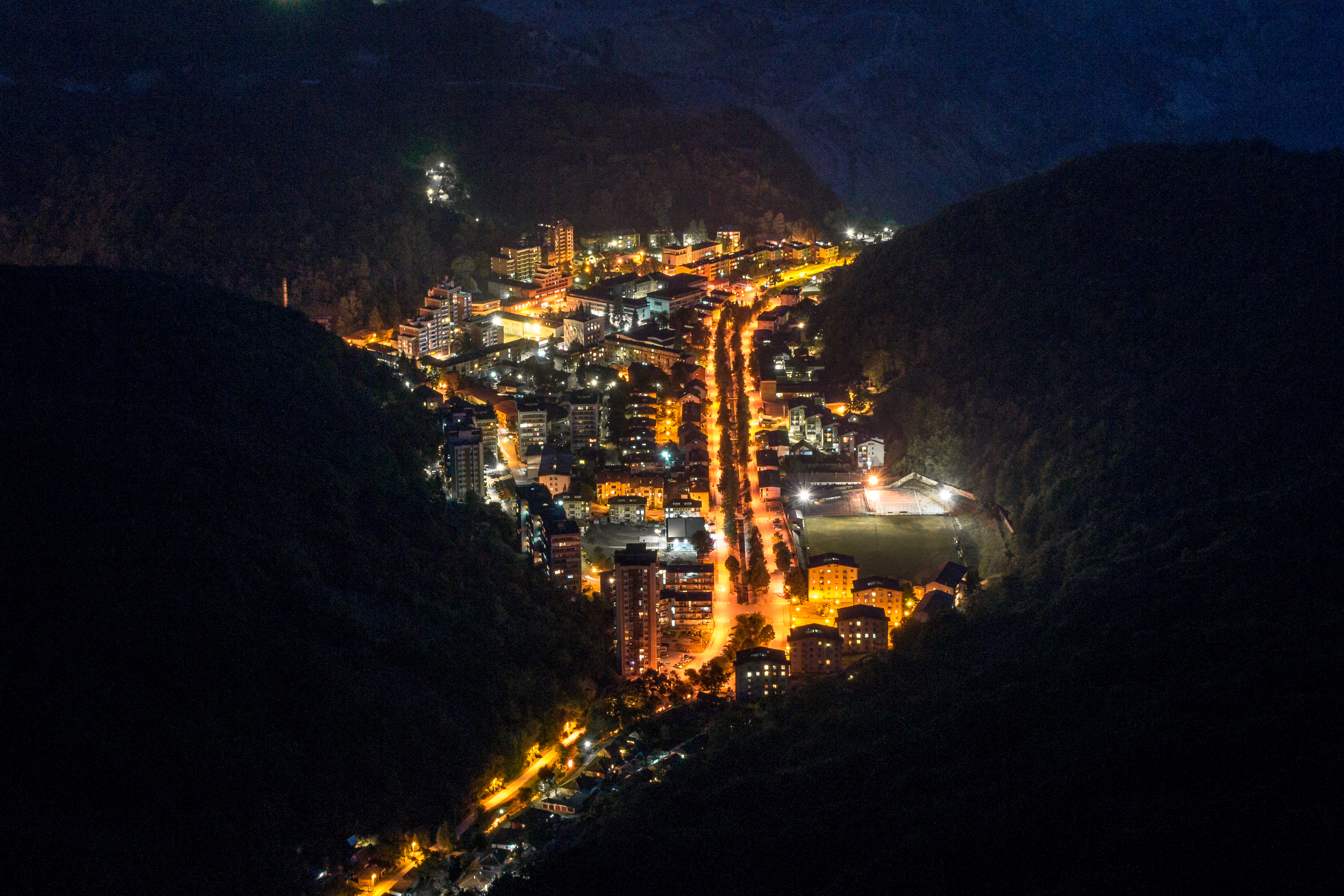
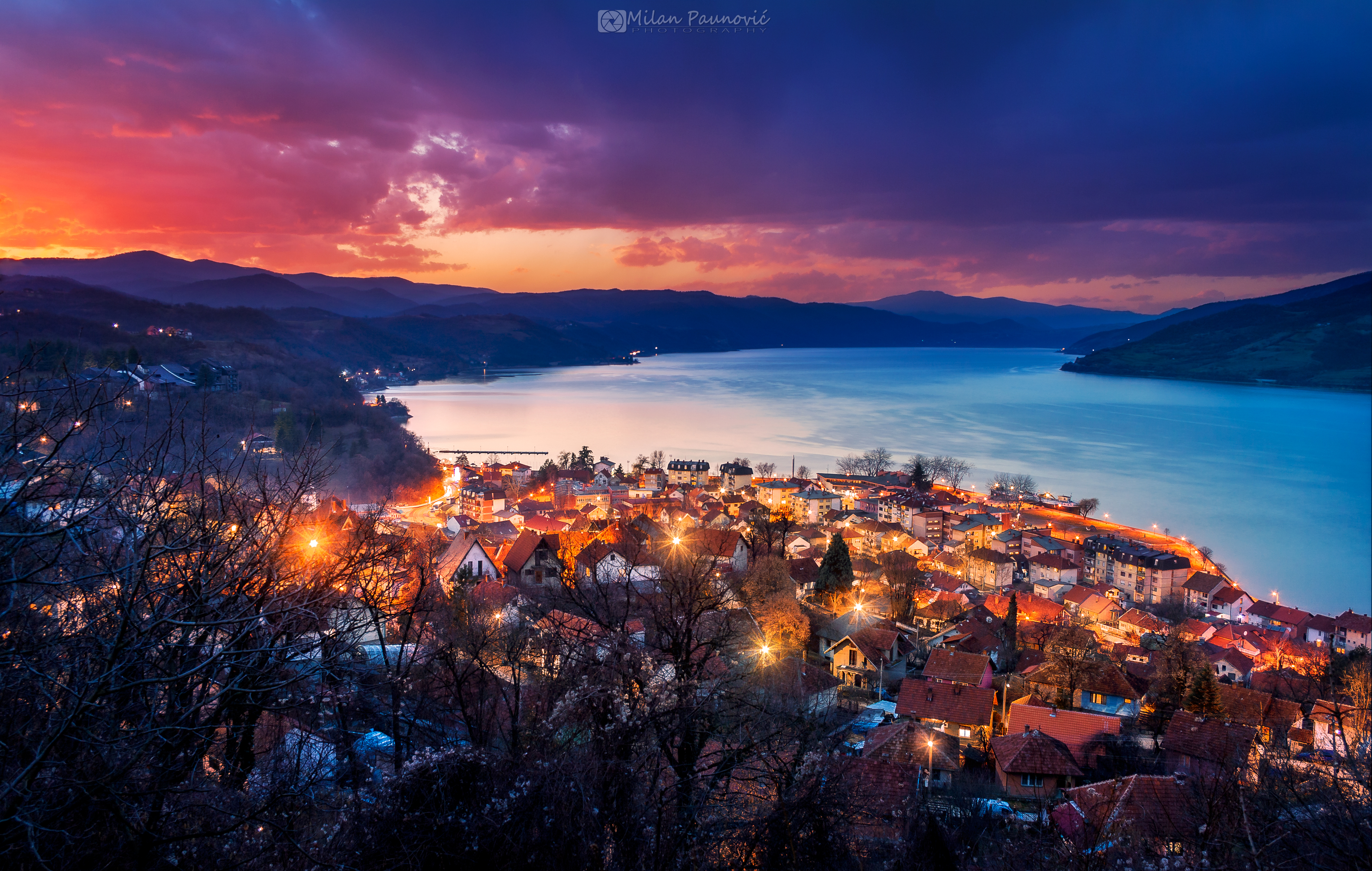
- From top: Majdanpek panorama, Donji Milanovac town panorama

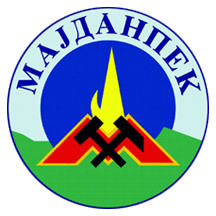
- Coat of arms

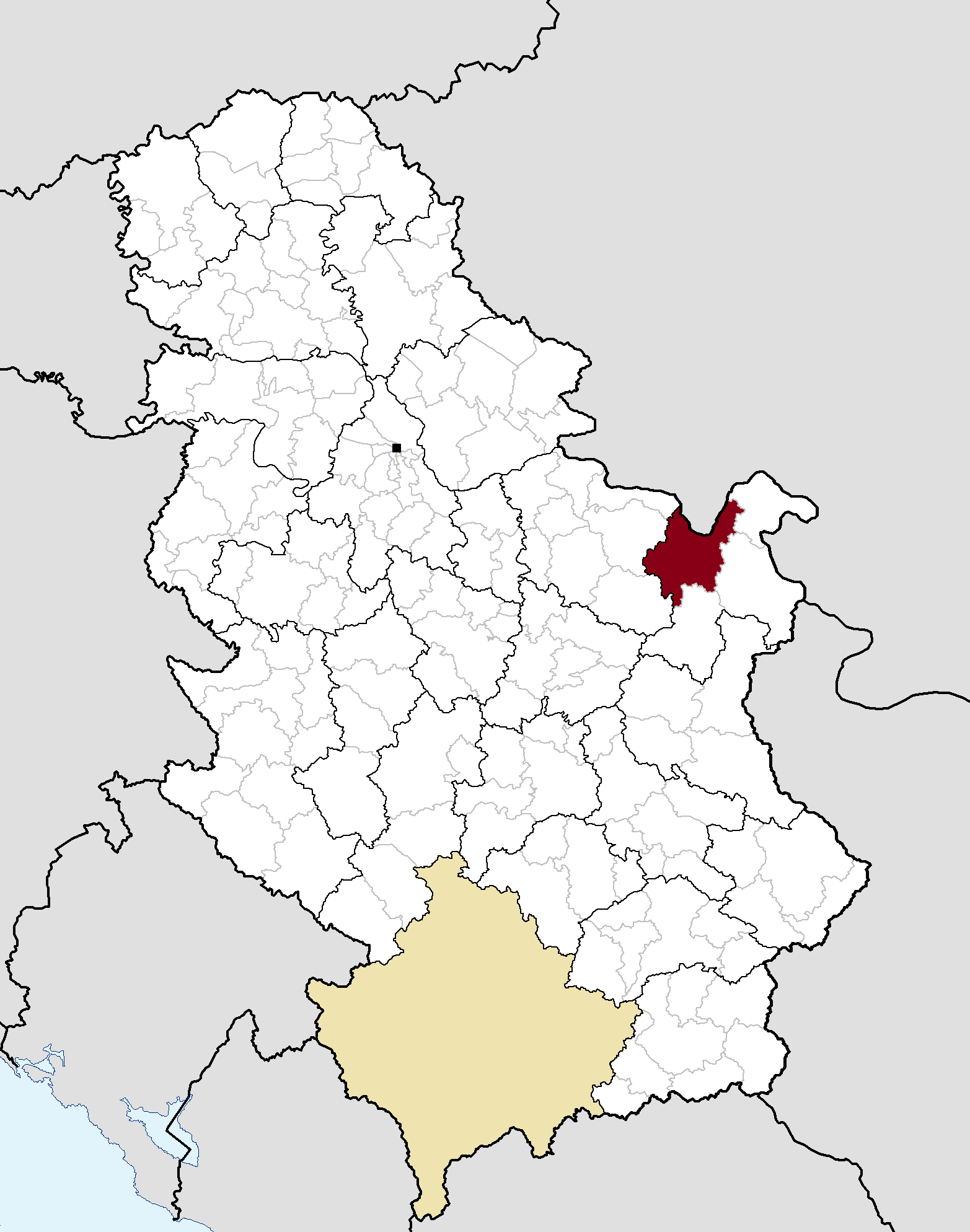
- Location of the municipality of Majdanpek within Serbia
- Coordinates: 44°25′N 21°56′E
- Country: Serbia
- Region: Southern and Eastern Serbia
- District: Bor
- Settlements: 14

Government
  - Mayor: Dragan Popović (SNS)

Area
  - Rank: 15th
  - Town: 178.08 km^{2} (68.76 sq mi)
  - Municipality: 931.70 km^{2} (359.73 sq mi)
- Elevation: 362 m (1,188 ft)

Population (2022 census)
  - Rank: 77th
  - Town: 6,326
  - Town density: 35.52/km^{2} (92.01/sq mi)
  - Municipality: 14,559
  - Municipality density: 15.626/km^{2} (40.472/sq mi)
- Time zone: UTC+1 (CET)
  - Summer (DST): UTC+2 (CEST)
- Postal code: 19250
- Area code: +381(0)30
- Car plates: BO
- Website: www.majdanpek.rs

Majdanpek (Serbian Cyrillic: Мајданпек; Romanian: Maidan) is a town and municipality located in the Bor District of the eastern Serbia, and is not far from the border of Romania. According to 2022 census, the municipality of Majdanpek had a population of 14,559 people, while the town of Majdanpek had a population of 8,310.

== Name ==
The name "Majdanpek" is derived from the words majdan meaning "quarry" (from Arabic maydān) and pek meaning "much, big, very" in Turkish. In Romanian, the town is known as Maidan.

== History ==
There is an archaeological site in Majdanpek, from the time of the Vinča culture, which provides one of the earliest known examples of copper metallurgy, dated to 5th millennium BC. Chalcolithic excavations exist in Kapetanova Pecina, Praurija, Kameni Rog and Roman site of Kamenjar.

The town is famous as a copper mine district, since the early 17th century. The origin of the name is based on words majdan (related to Turkish madän, mine) and river Pek - mine on river Pek. Throughout its history, mining development was held by many foreign owners (Czechs, Belgians, Austrians), and was extensively exploited. The town was industrialized in the mid-20th century. Through the late 20th century, the town was in a period of industrial progress and one of the most developed areas in copper mining and metallurgy.

== Geography ==
=== Climate ===
Majdanpek has a humid continental climate (Köppen climate classification: Dfb).

Climate data for Majdanpek
Month	Jan	Feb	Mar	Apr	May	Jun	Jul	Aug	Sep	Oct	Nov	Dec	Year
Mean daily maximum °C (°F)	1.7 (35.1)	3.3 (37.9)	9.1 (48.4)	14.9 (58.8)	19.9 (67.8)	23.0 (73.4)	25.6 (78.1)	25.7 (78.3)	21.8 (71.2)	15.3 (59.5)	7.6 (45.7)	2.8 (37.0)	14.2 (57.6)
Daily mean °C (°F)	−1.2 (29.8)	0.1 (32.2)	4.7 (40.5)	9.7 (49.5)	14.6 (58.3)	17.6 (63.7)	19.6 (67.3)	19.5 (67.1)	15.9 (60.6)	10.6 (51.1)	4.4 (39.9)	0.3 (32.5)	9.7 (49.4)
Mean daily minimum °C (°F)	−4.0 (24.8)	−3.1 (26.4)	0.4 (32.7)	4.6 (40.3)	9.3 (48.7)	12.2 (54.0)	13.6 (56.5)	13.4 (56.1)	10.0 (50.0)	5.9 (42.6)	1.1 (34.0)	−2.2 (28.0)	5.1 (41.2)
Average precipitation mm (inches)	45 (1.8)	44 (1.7)	45 (1.8)	57 (2.2)	80 (3.1)	93 (3.7)	72 (2.8)	58 (2.3)	50 (2.0)	44 (1.7)	55 (2.2)	56 (2.2)	699 (27.5)
Source: Climate-Data.org

== Settlements ==
The municipality includes the following settlements:

Towns

- Majdanpek
- Donji Milanovac

Villages

- Boljetin
- Vlaole
- Golubinje
- Debeli Lug
- Jasikovo
- Klokočevac
- Leskovo
- Miroč
- Mosna
- Rudna Glava
- Topolnica
- Crnajka

== Demographics ==
Historical population
Year	Pop.	±% p.a.
1948	19,610	—
1953	21,155	+1.53%
1961	23,022	+1.06%
1971	26,120	+1.27%
1981	26,628	+0.19%
1991	27,378	+0.28%
2002	23,703	−1.30%
2011	18,686	−2.61%
2022	14,559	−2.24%

According to the 2022 census results, the municipality of Majdanpek has a population of 14,559 inhabitants.

=== Ethnic groups ===
Most of the settlements in the Majdanpek municipality have Serb ethnic majority. The settlement with a Romanian ethnic majority is Vlaole. Ethnically mixed settlement with relative Romanian majority is Jasikovo. The ethnic composition of the municipality:

Ethnic group	Population	%
Serbs	14,670	78.51%
Vlachs	2,442	13.07%
Montenegrins	70	0.37%
Romanians (self-declared)	68	0.36%
Macedonians	56	0.30%
Yugoslavs	51	0.27%
Croats	33	0.18%
Bulgarians	22	0.12%
Others	1,274	6.82%
Total	18,686	

== Tourism ==
One of the most notable tourist attractions in Majdanpek is Rajkova Pećina (Rajko's Cave).

== Economy ==
The Majdanpek mine, owned and operated by the Serbia Zijin Bor Copper, dominates the industrial landscape of the city. The following table gives a preview of total number of registered people employed in legal entities per their core activity (as of 2024):

Activity	Total
Agriculture, forestry and fishing	101
Mining and quarrying	1,471
Manufacturing	368
Electricity, gas, steam and air conditioning supply	63
Water supply; sewerage, waste management and remediation activities	122
Construction	181
Wholesale and retail trade, repair of motor vehicles and motorcycles	380
Transportation and storage	94
Accommodation and food services	141
Information and communication	27
Financial and insurance activities	28
Real estate activities	2
Professional, scientific and technical activities	46
Administrative and support service activities	26
Public administration and defense; compulsory social security	260
Education	286
Human health and social work activities	356
Arts, entertainment and recreation	149
Other service activities	29
Individual agricultural workers	29
Total	4,160

== Gallery ==
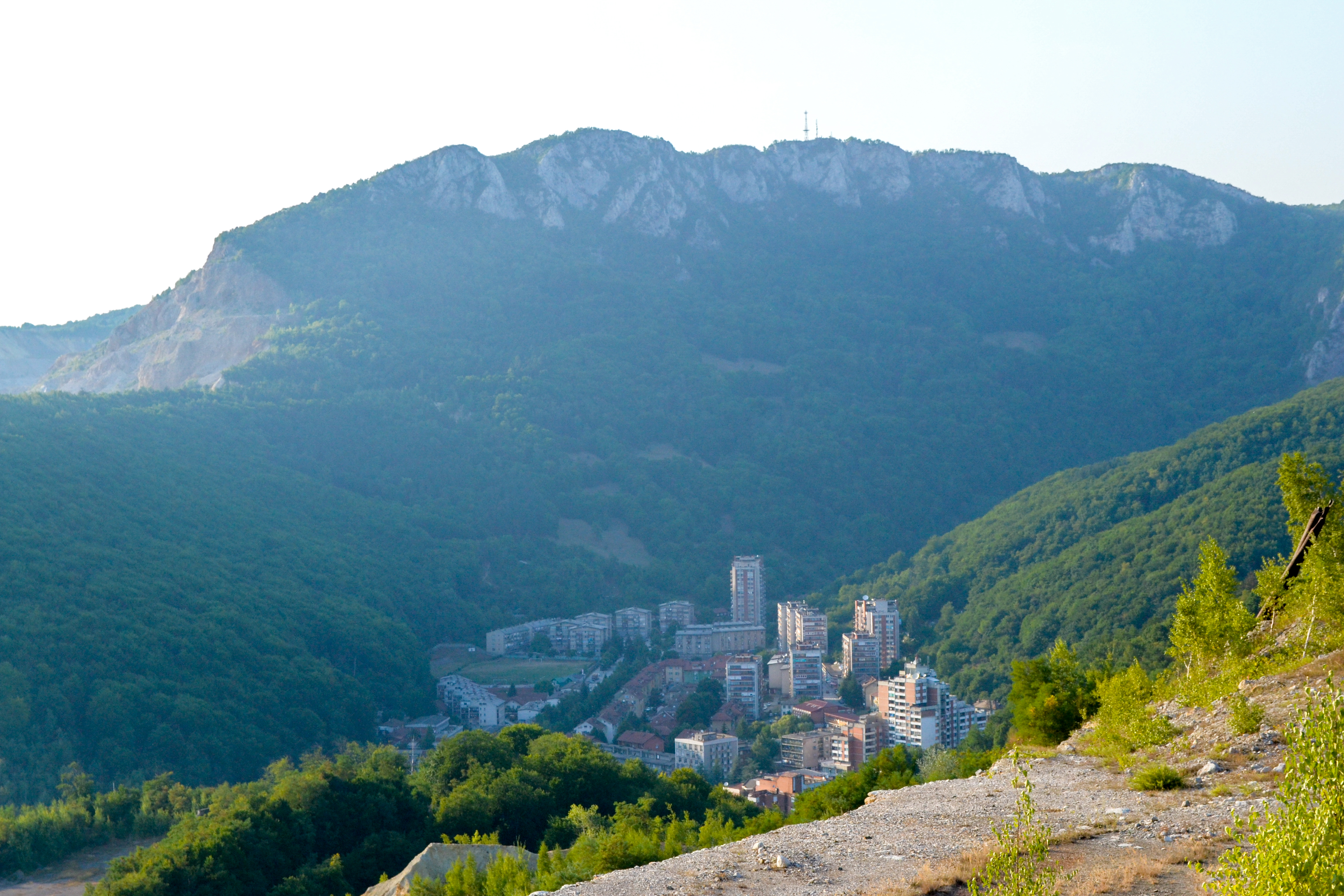
Majdanpek Downtown

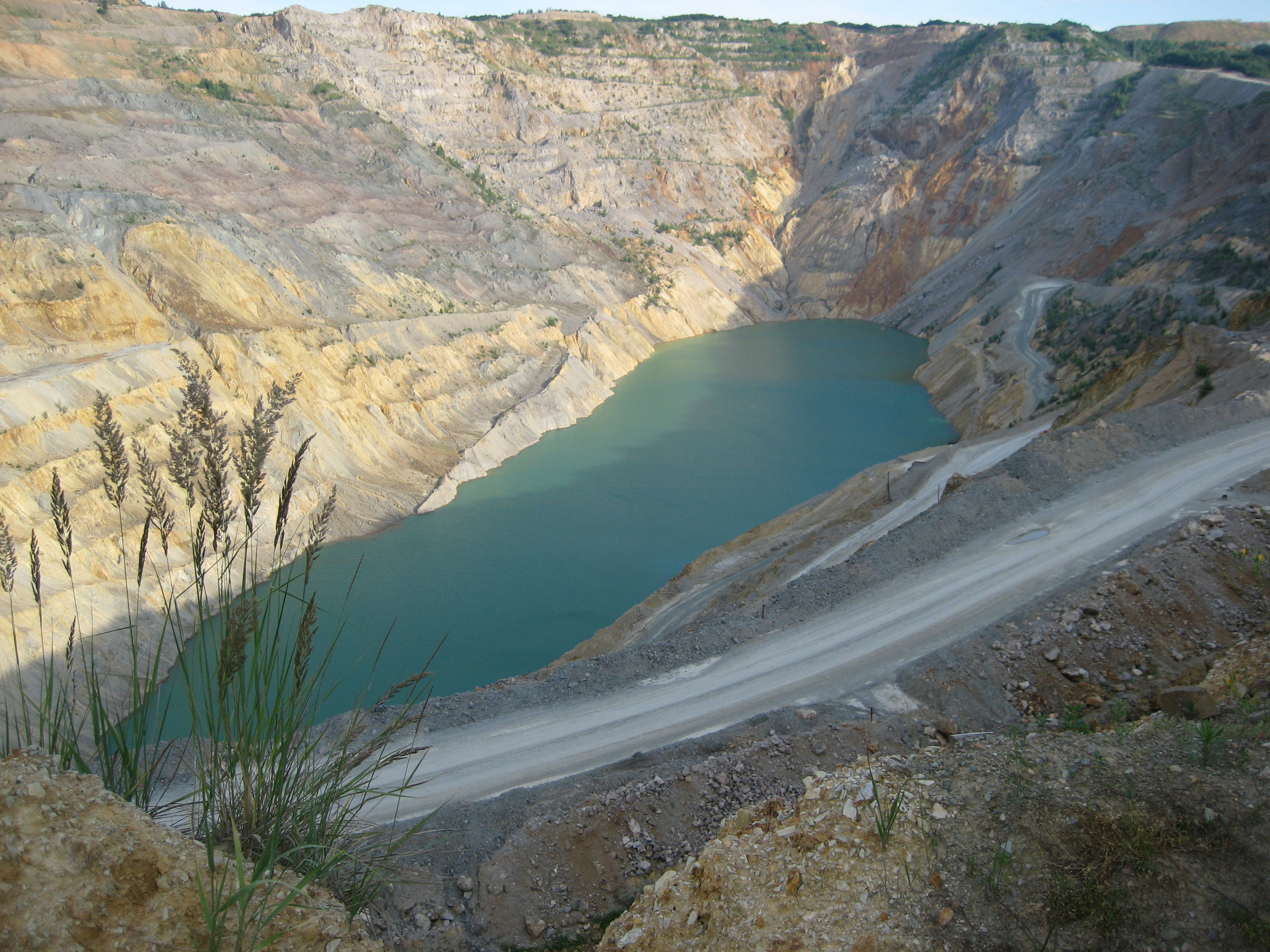
Majdanpek Mines

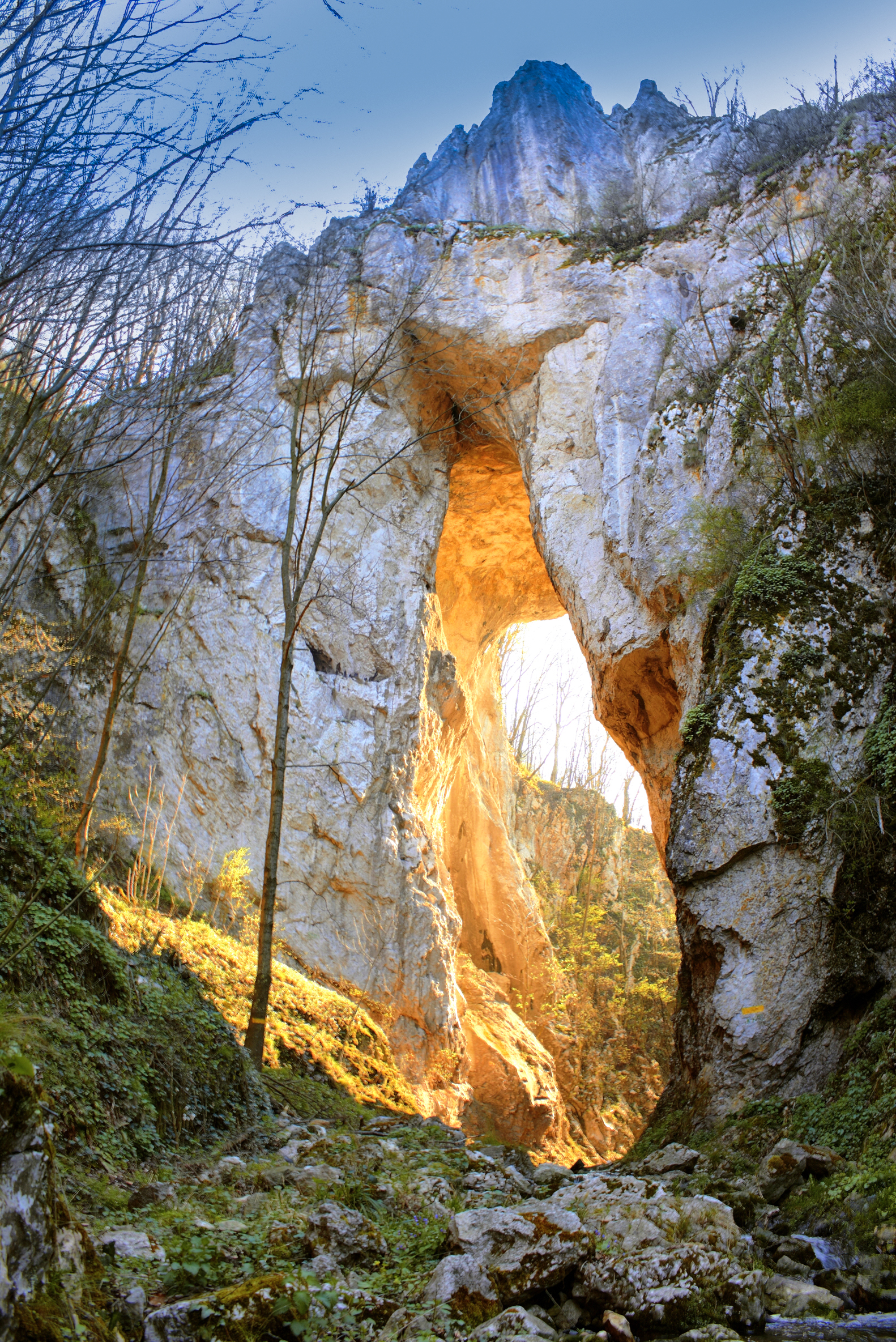
Majdanpek Nature

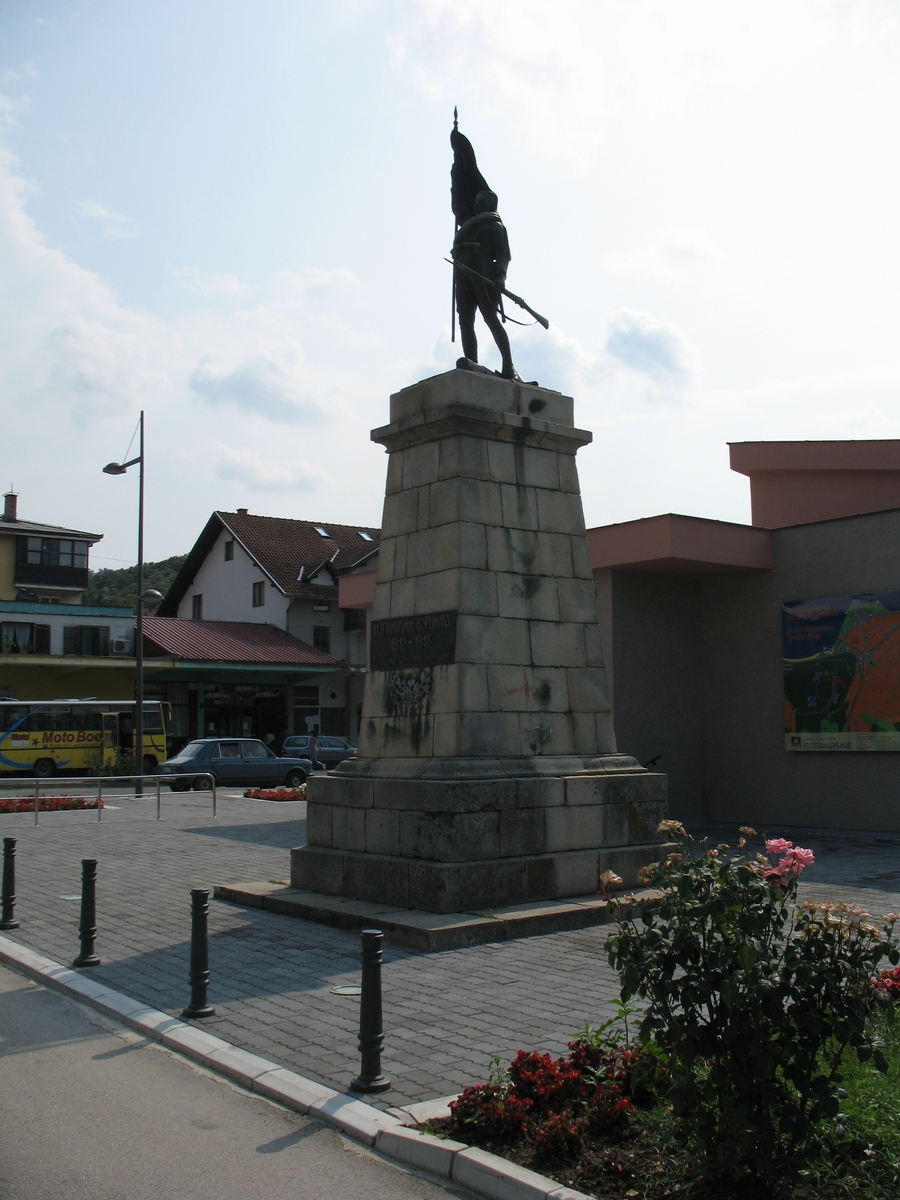
Donji Milanovac Monument

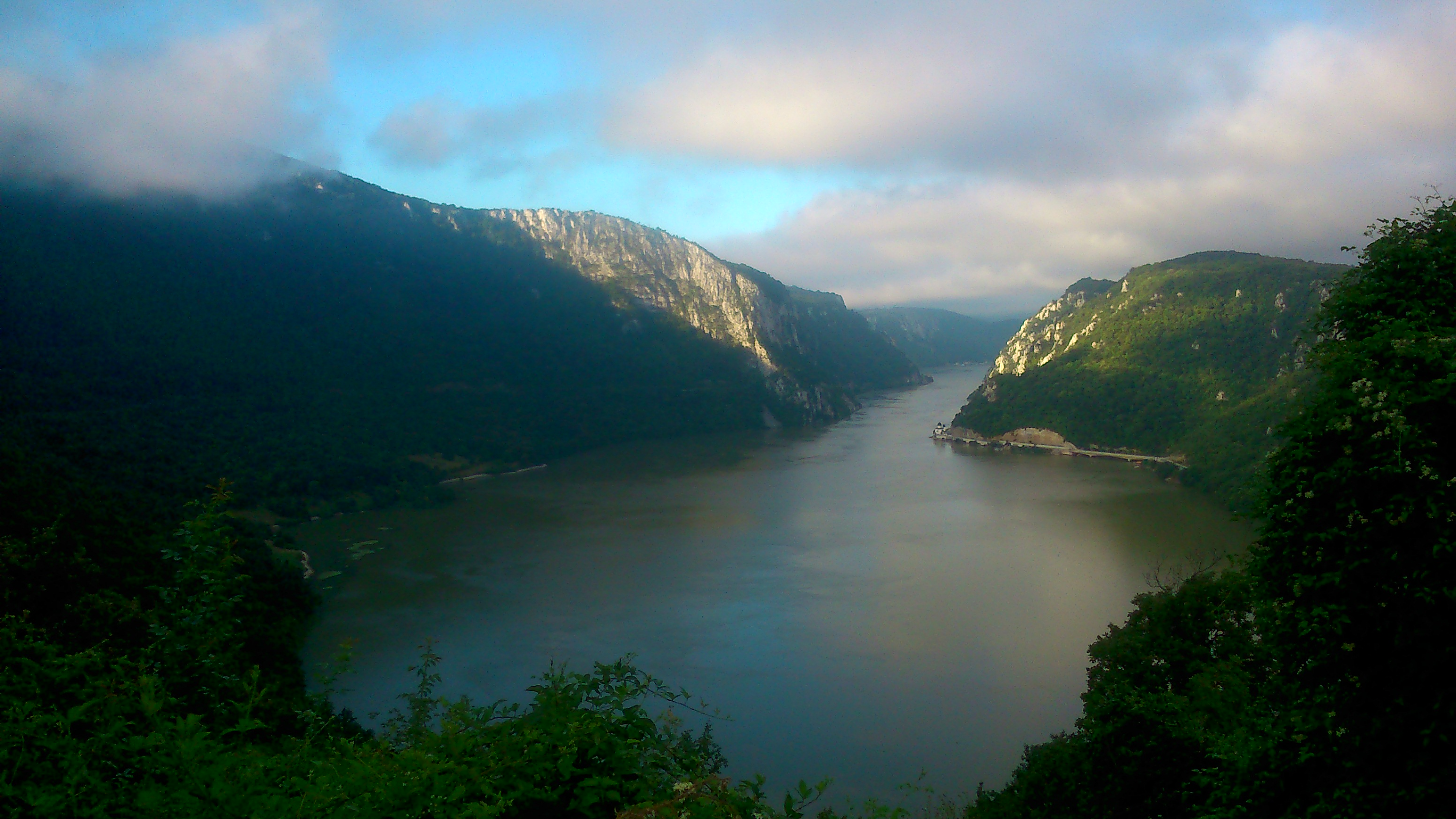
Đerdap national park

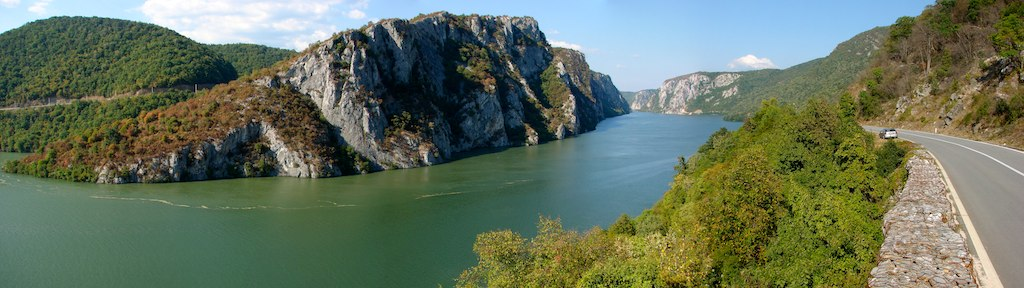
Đerdap national park

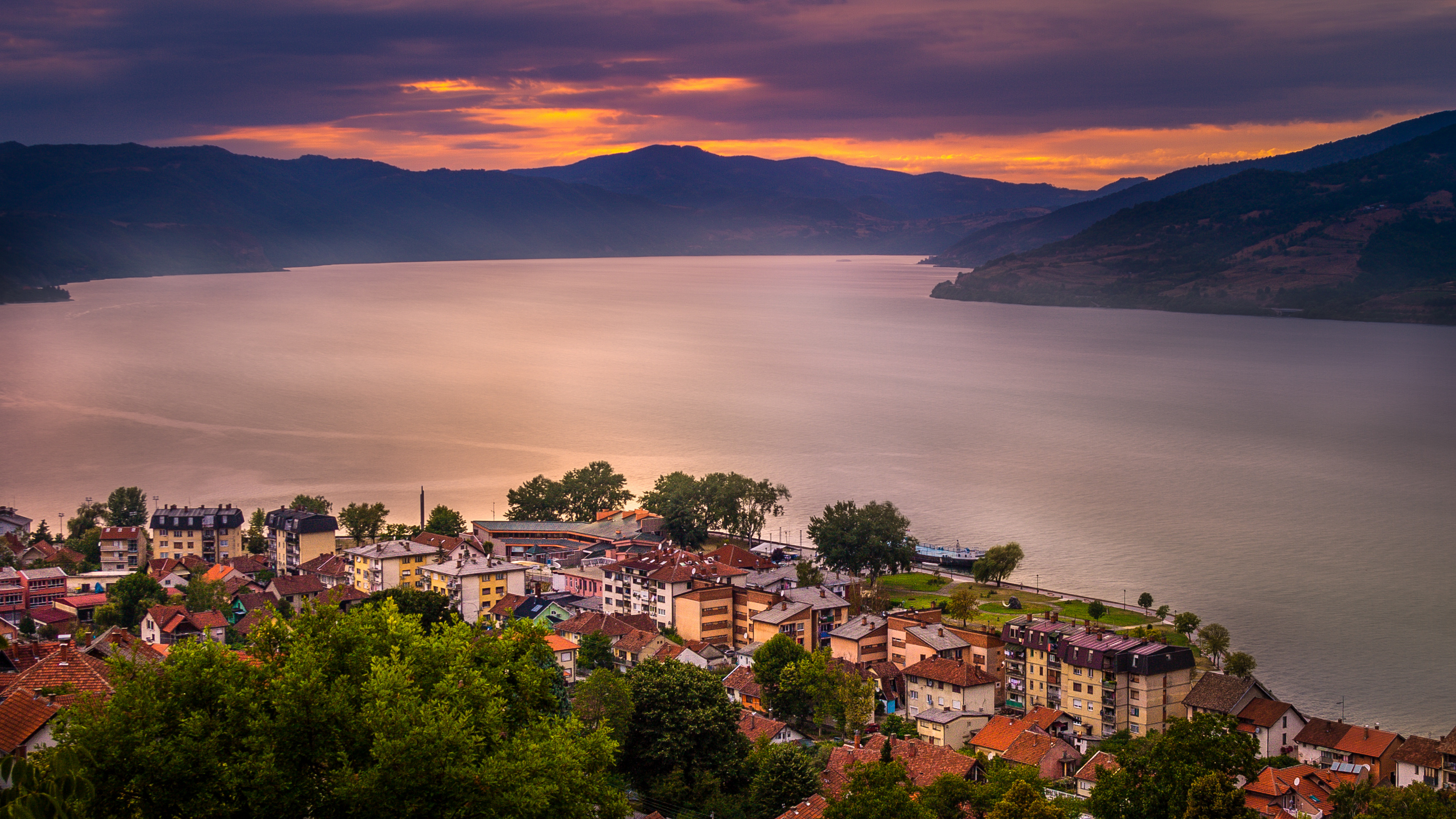
Donji Milanovac panorama

== Notable people ==
- Dejan Petkovic (born 1972), Serbian football player

== See also ==
- Subdivisions of Serbia
