= Bor District =

Administrative district of Serbia

Bor District Борски округ
- Administrative district of Serbia
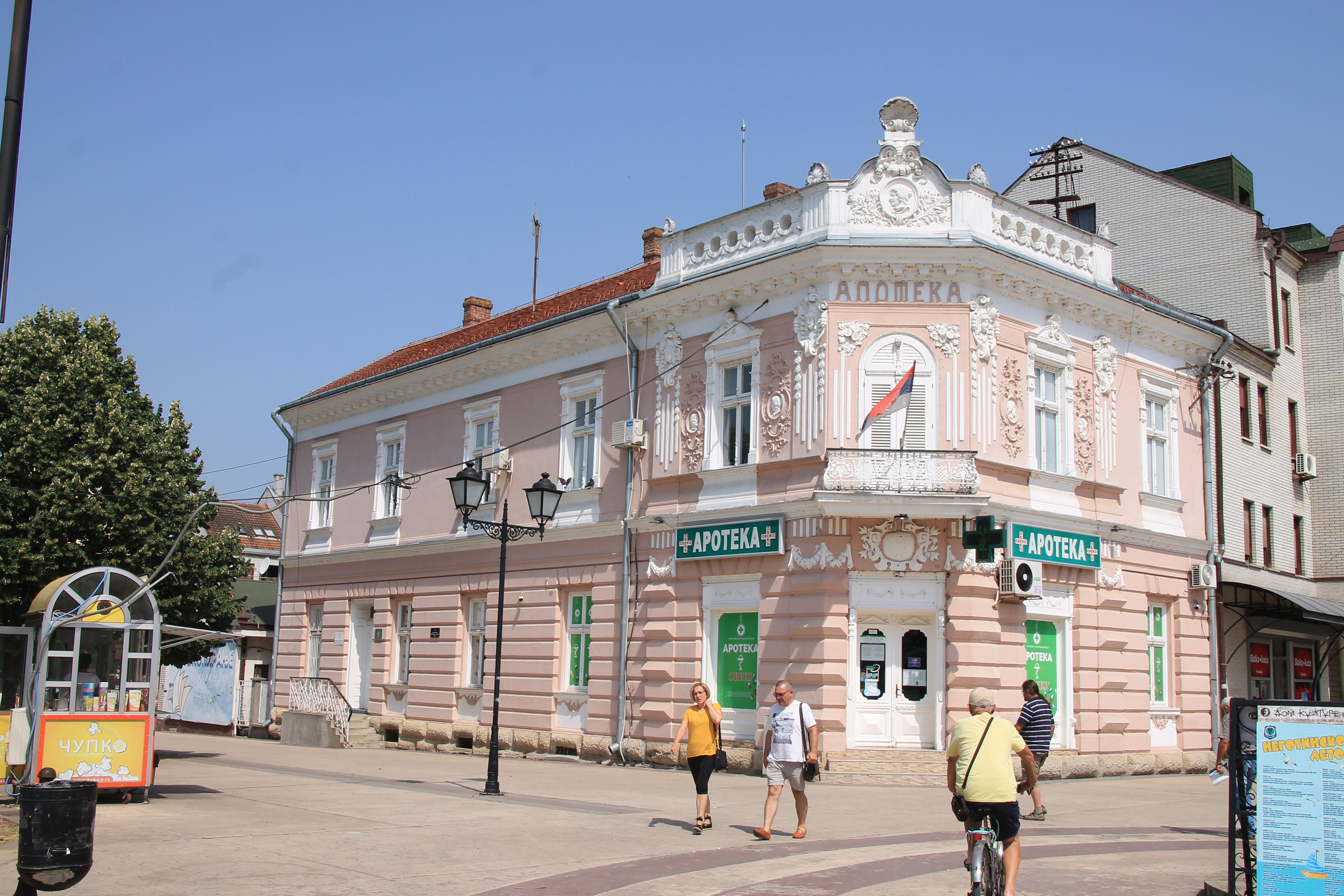
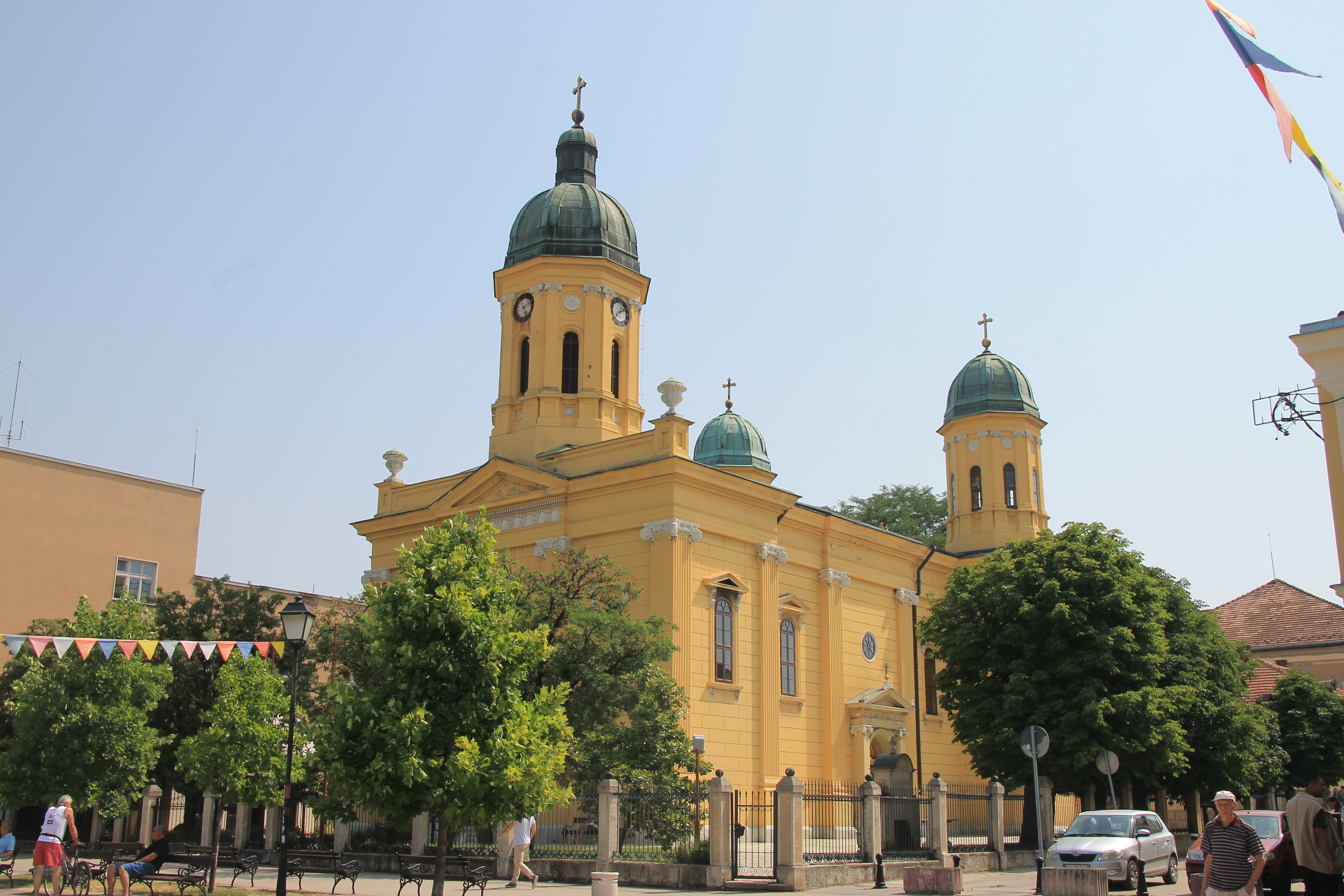
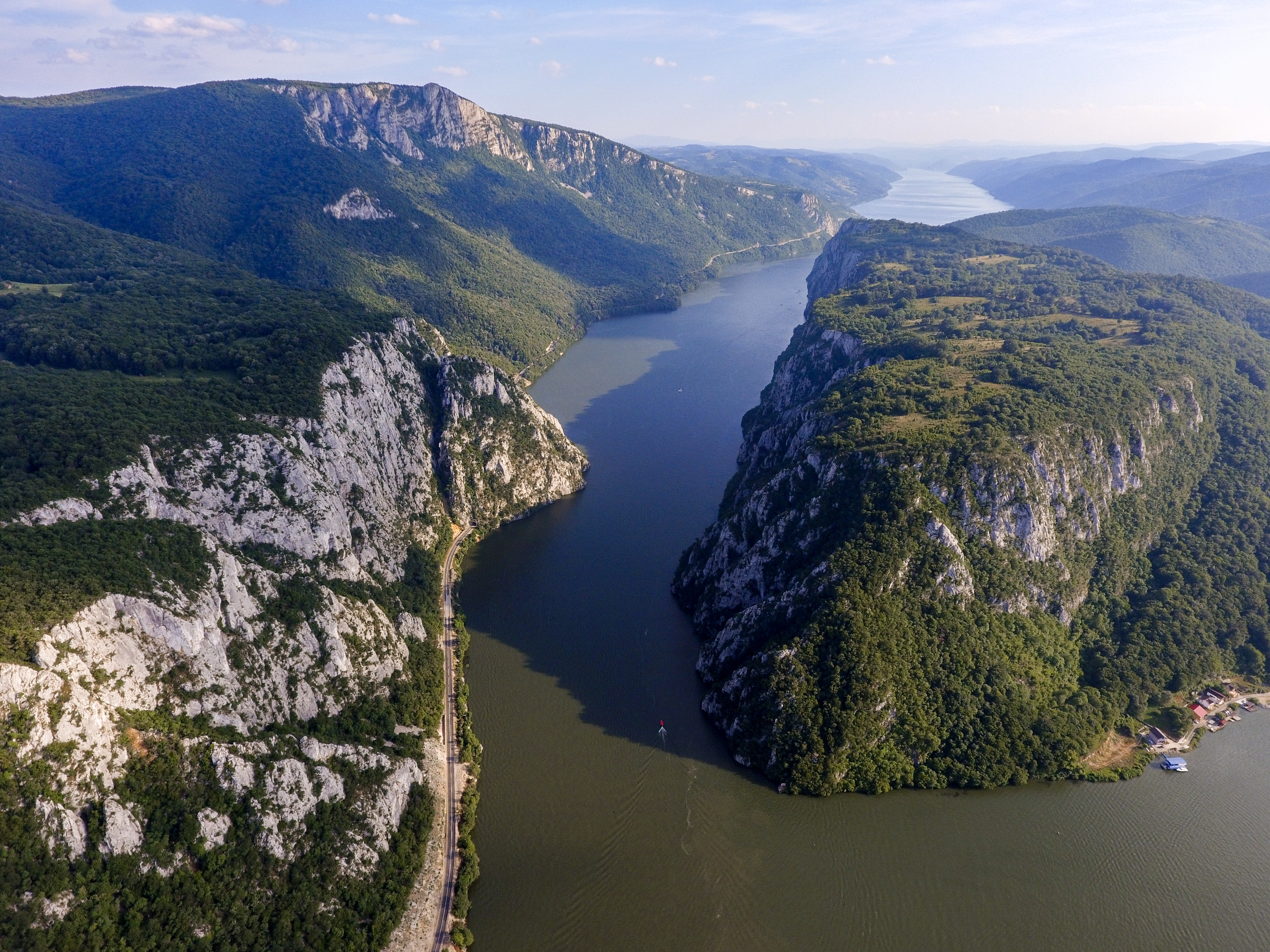
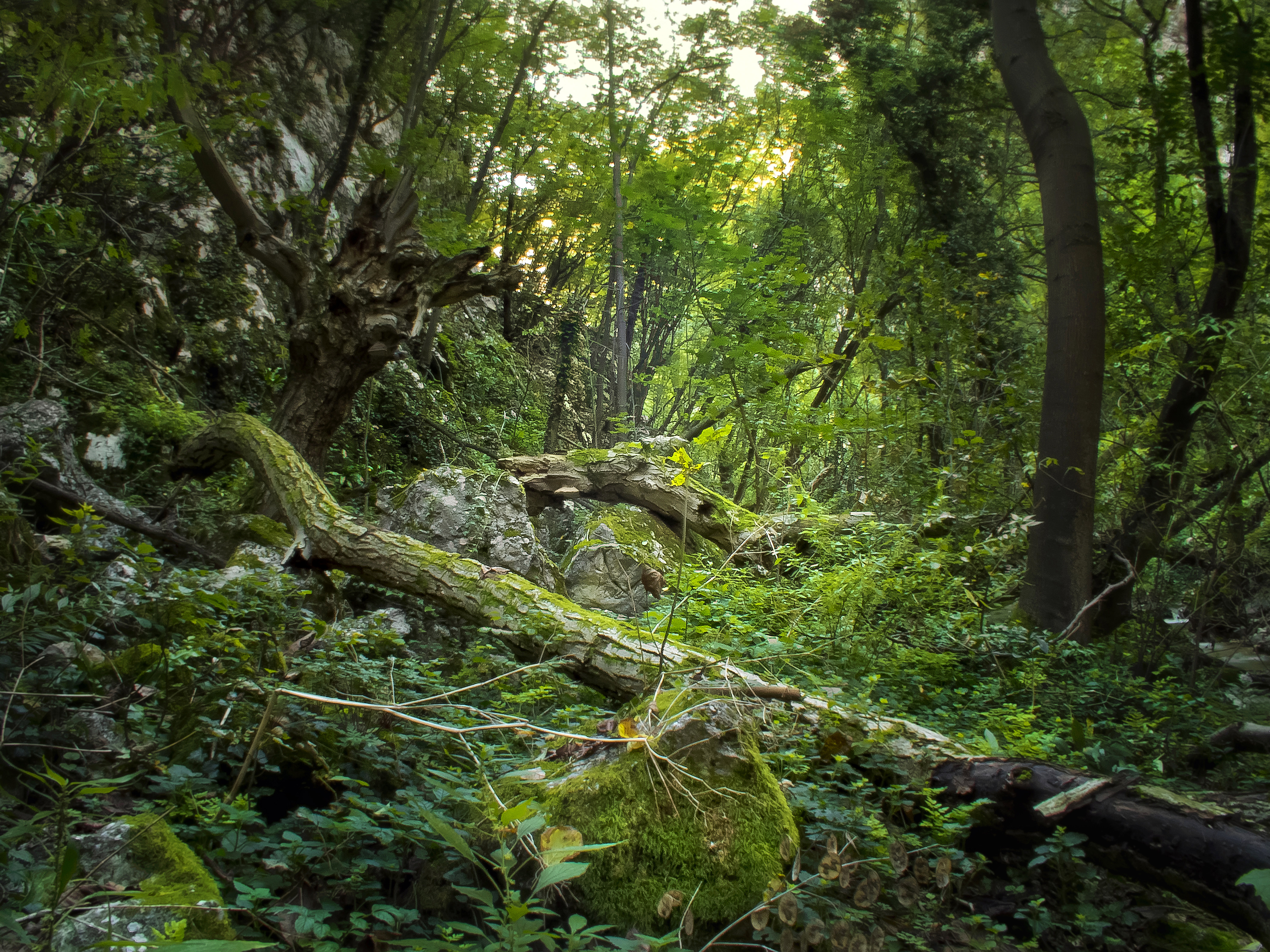
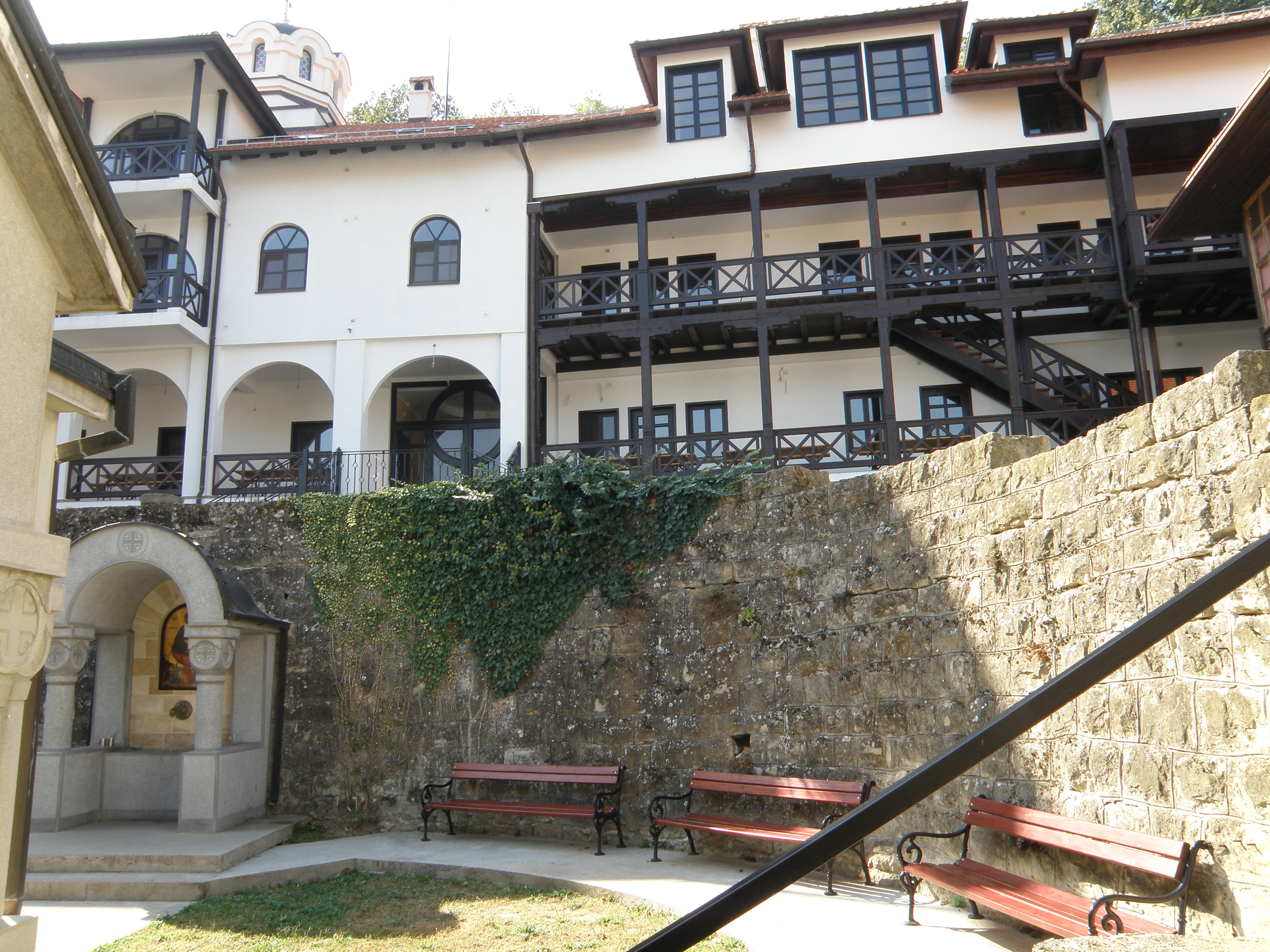
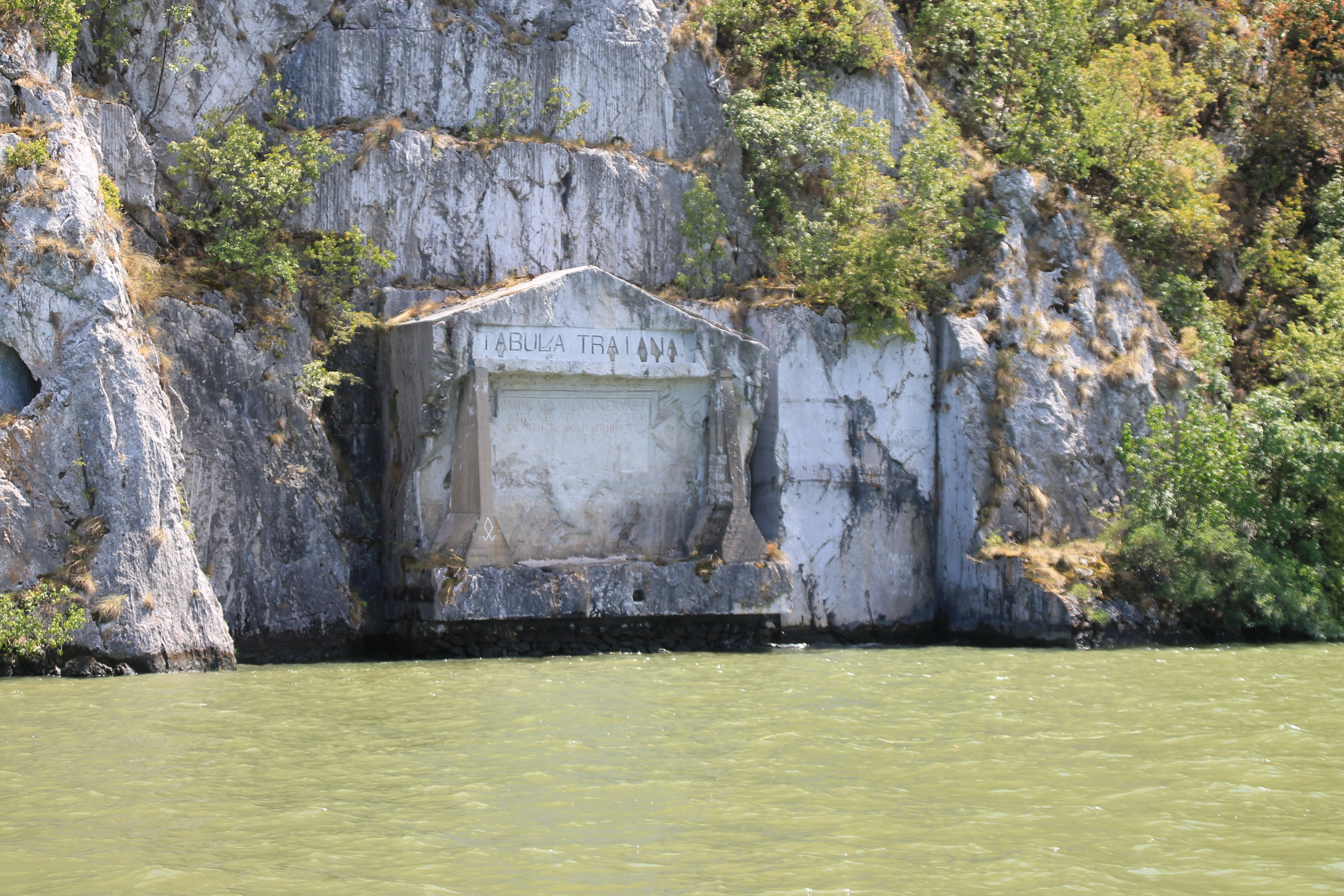
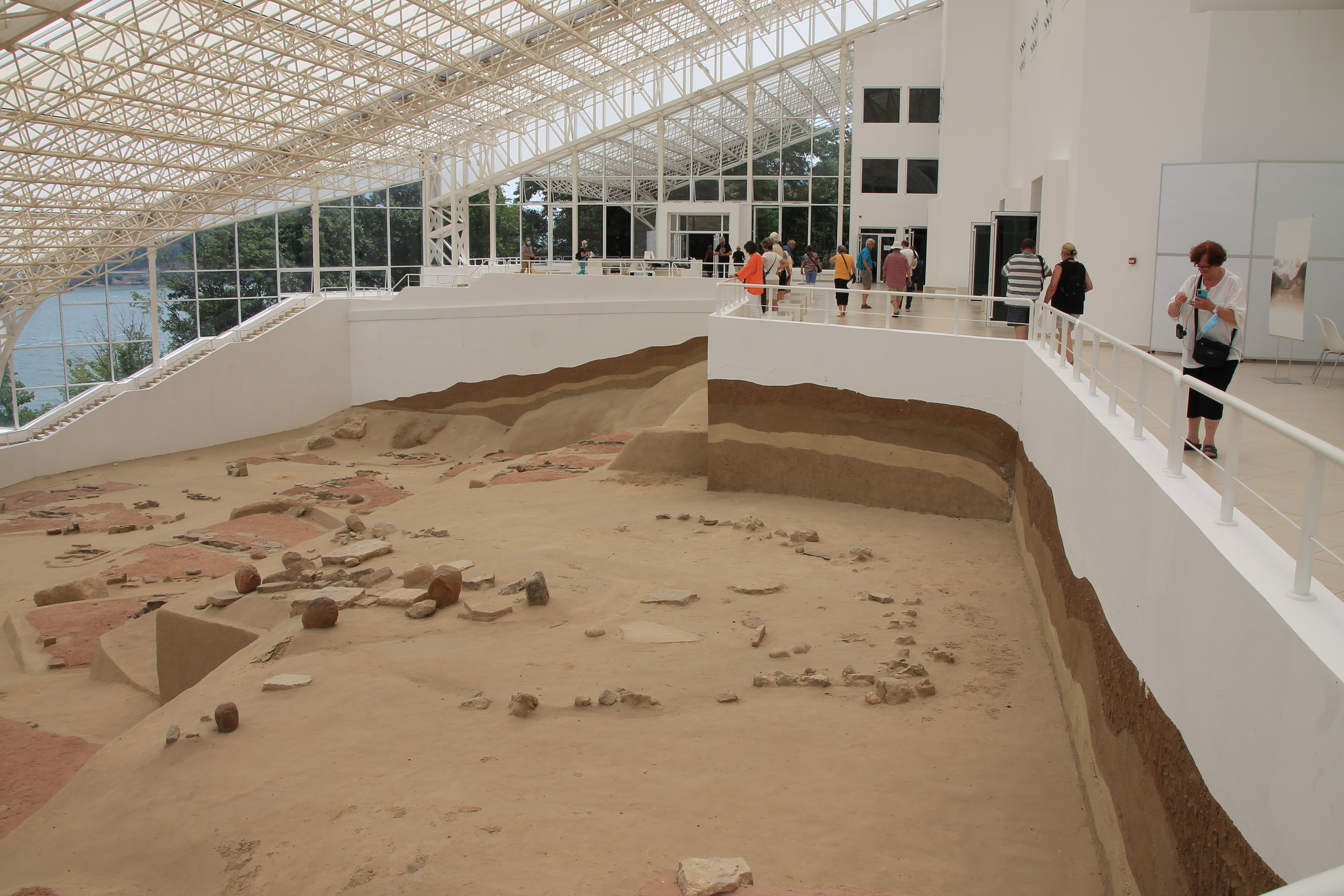
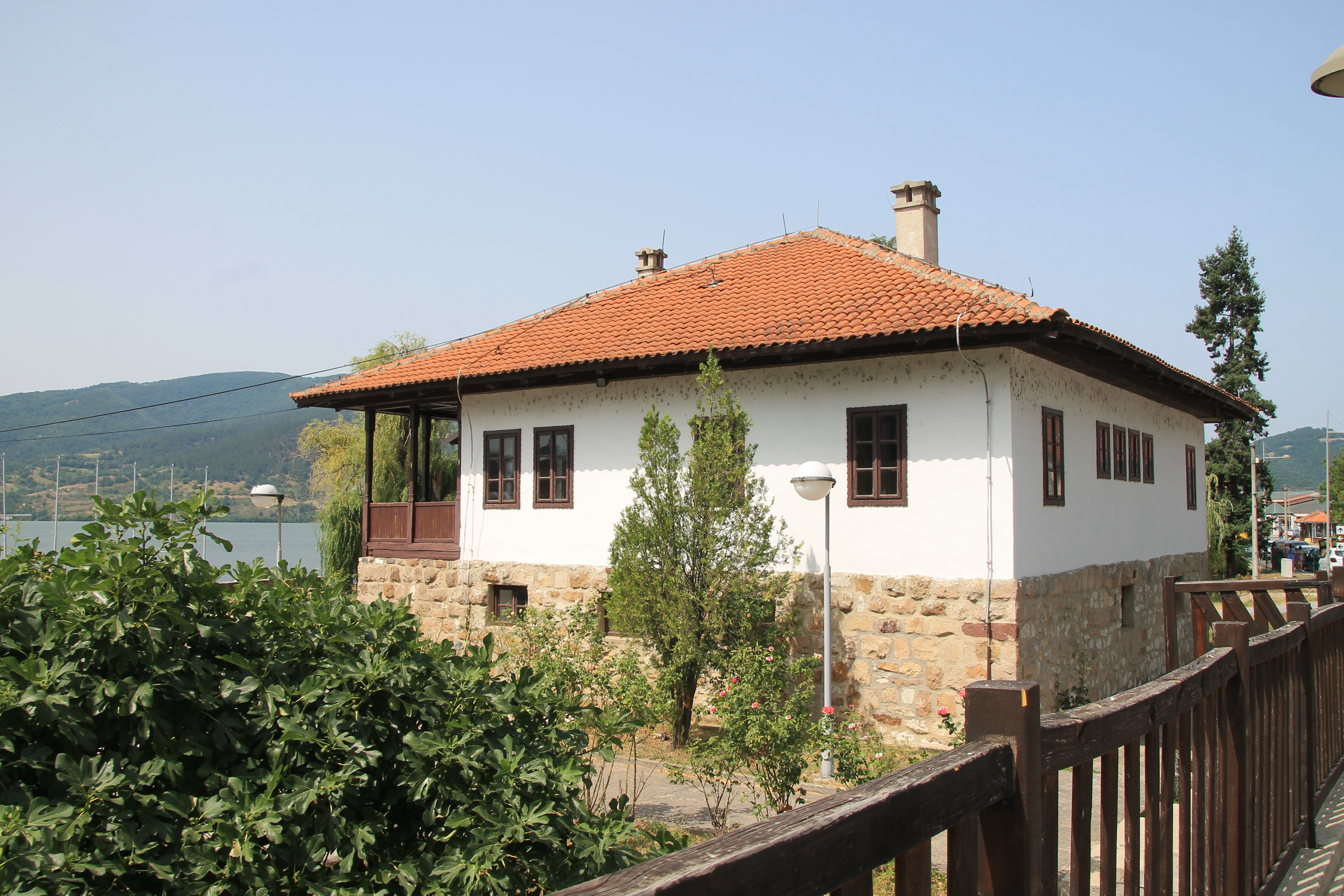
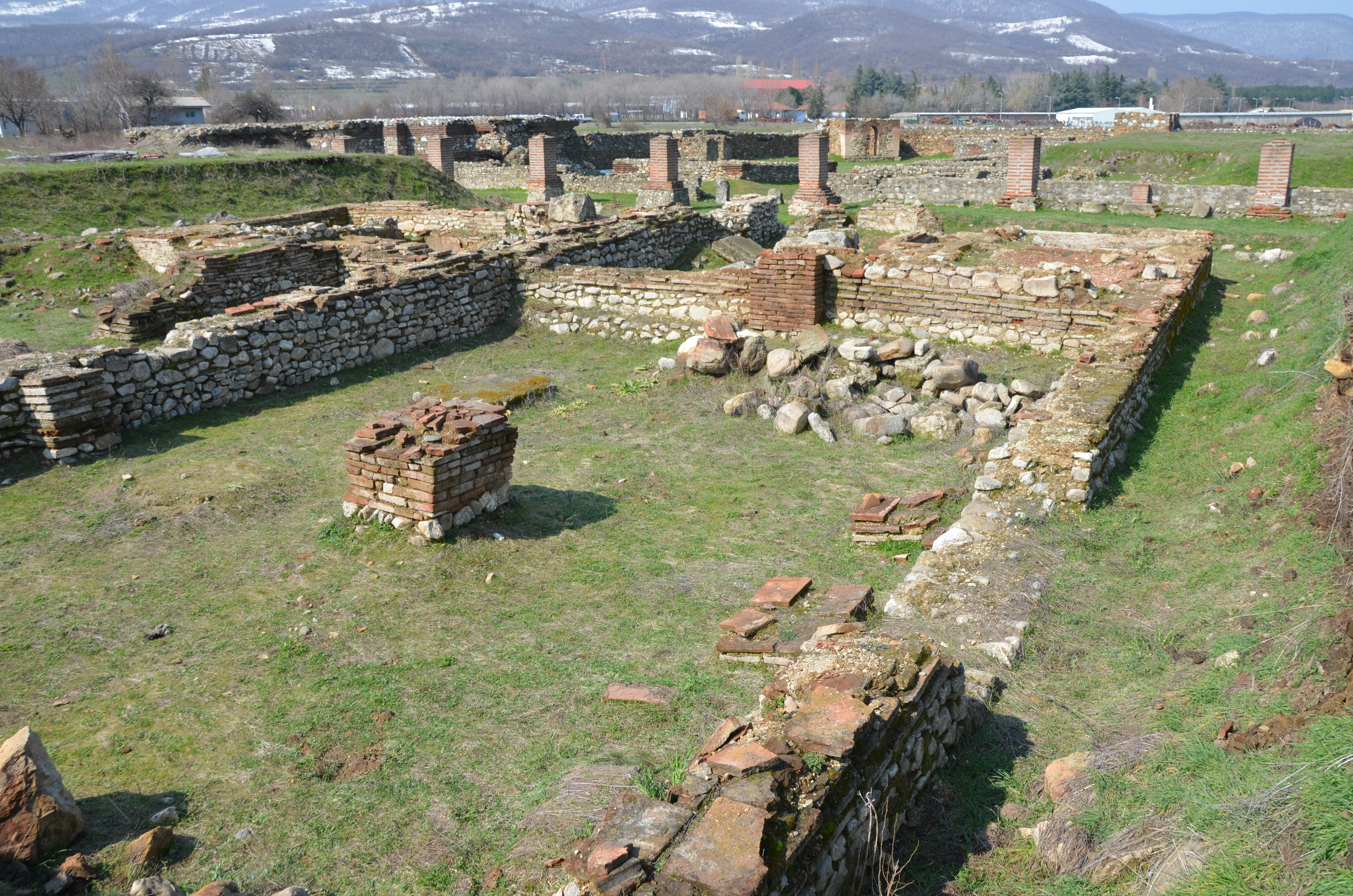
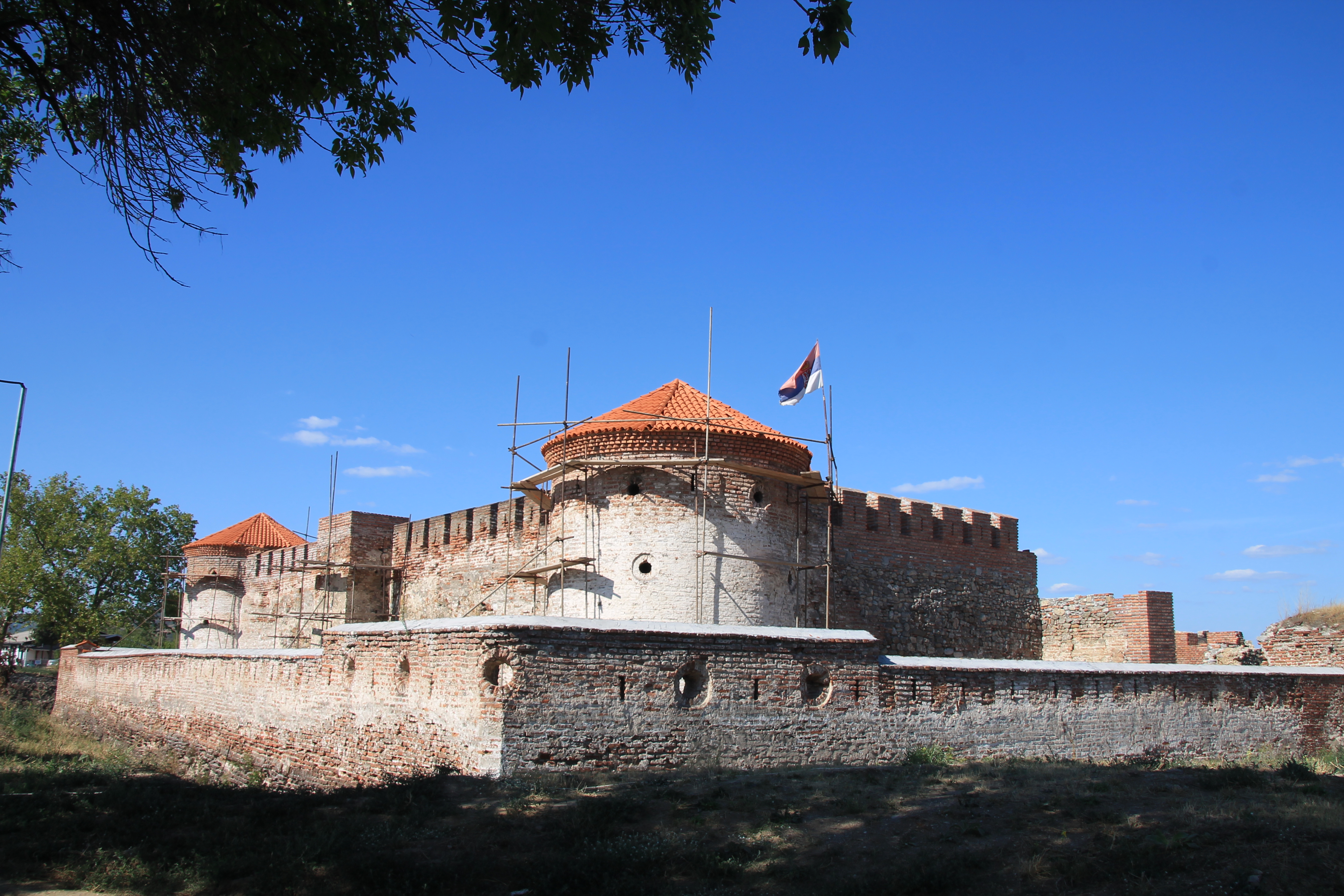
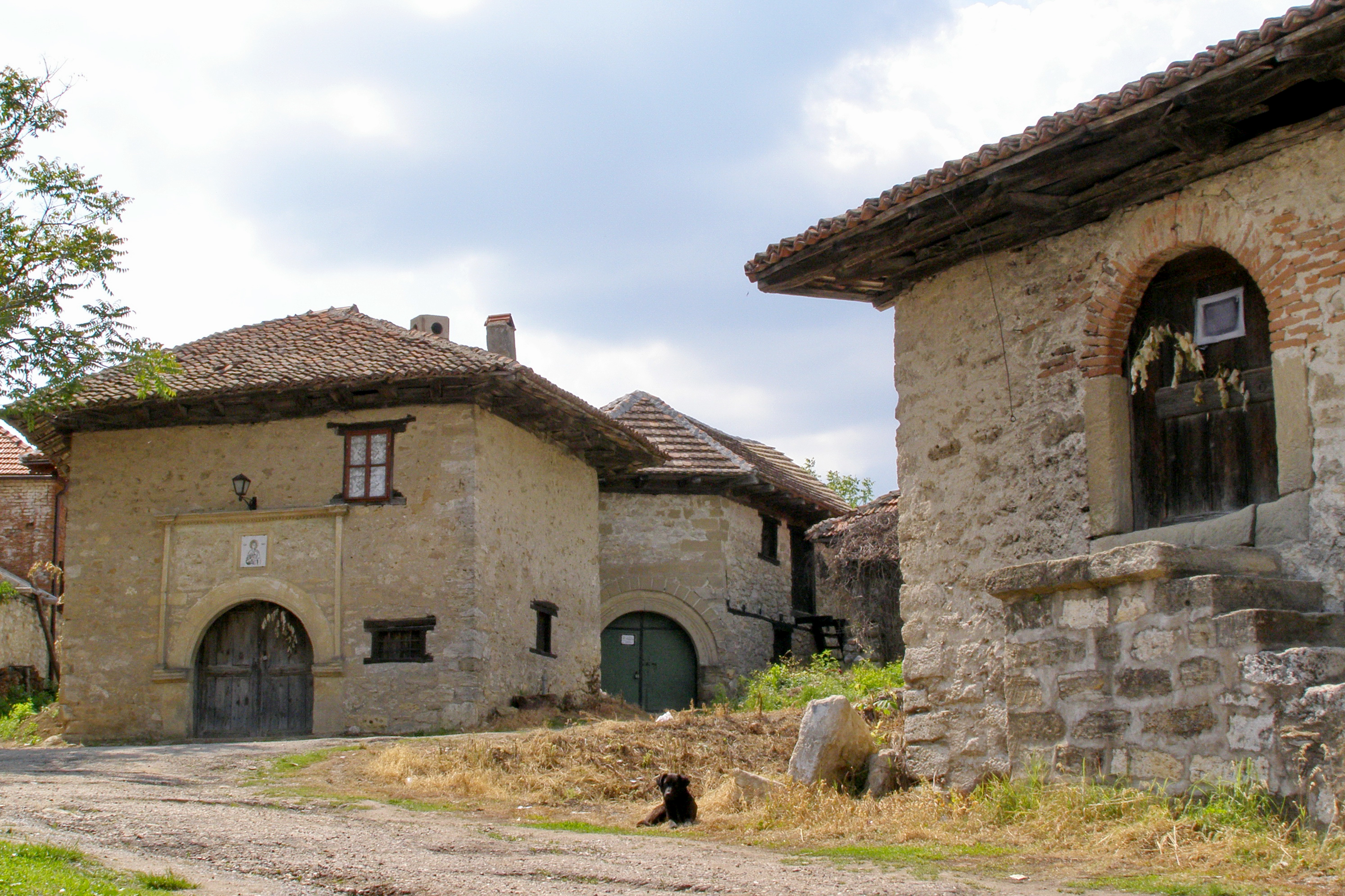
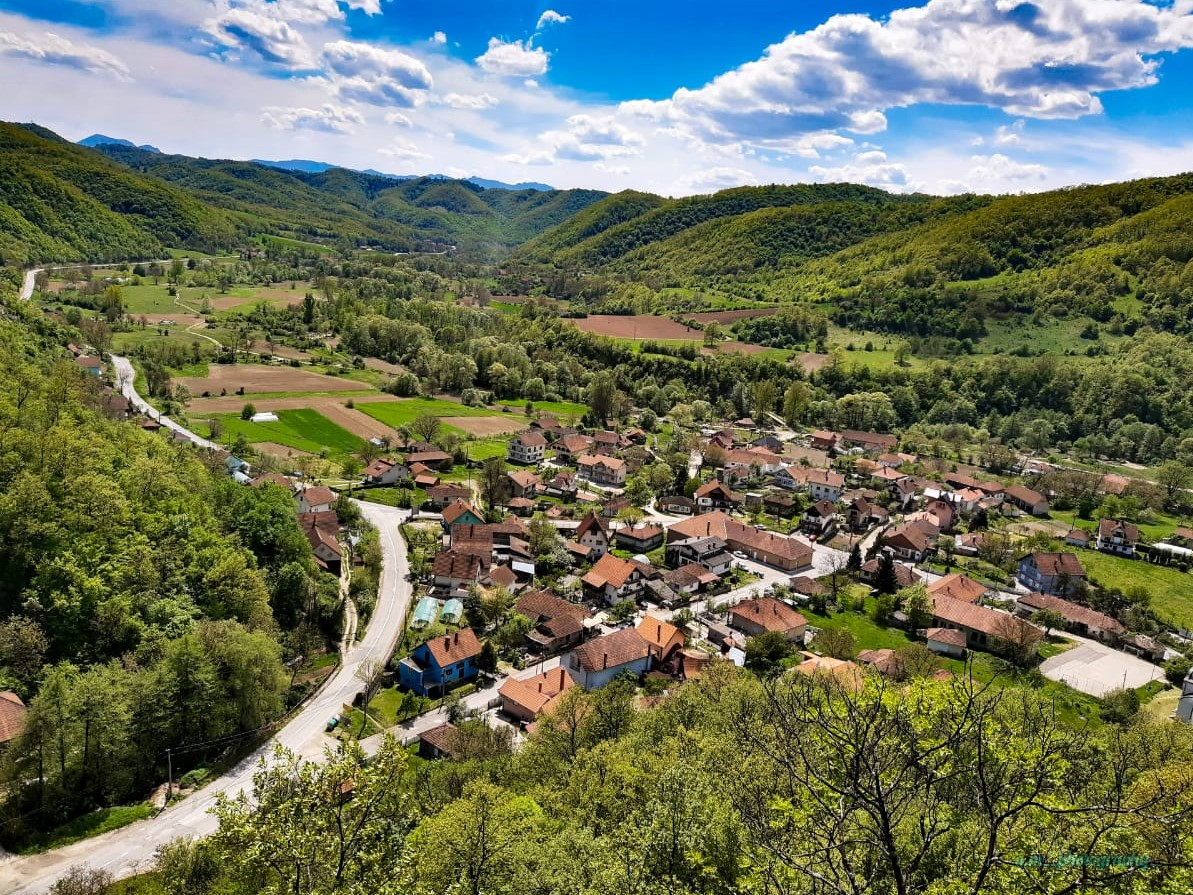
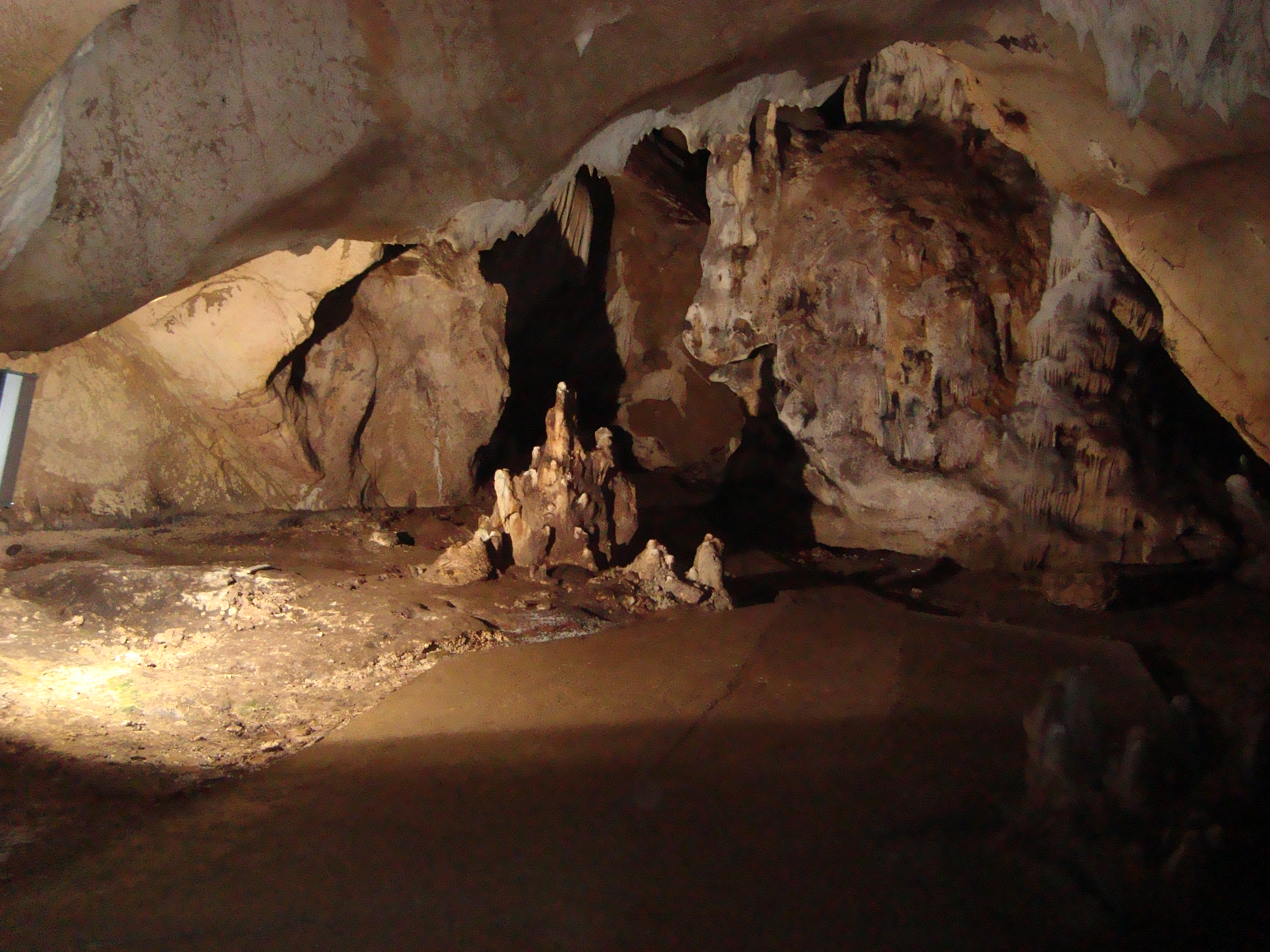
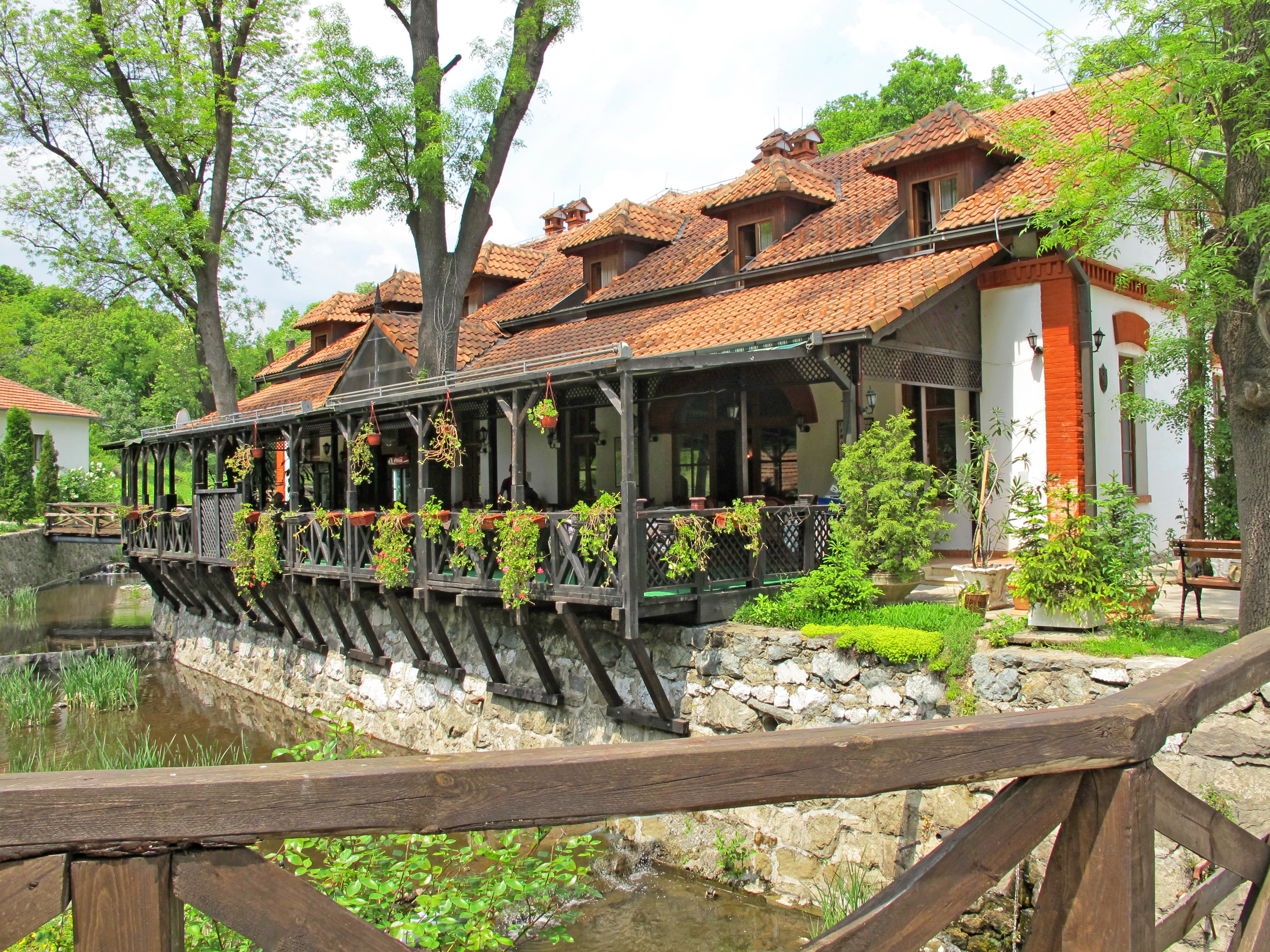
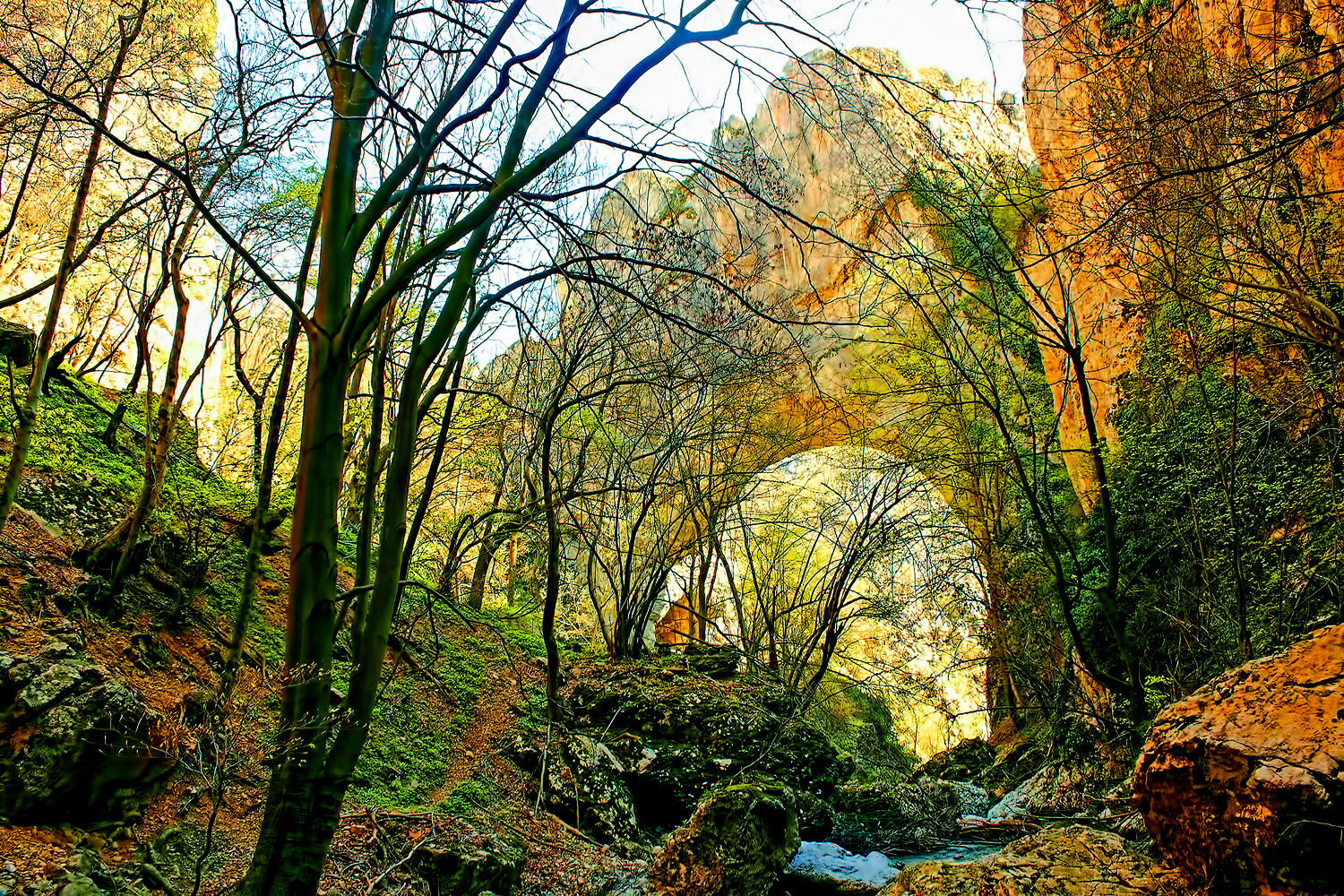
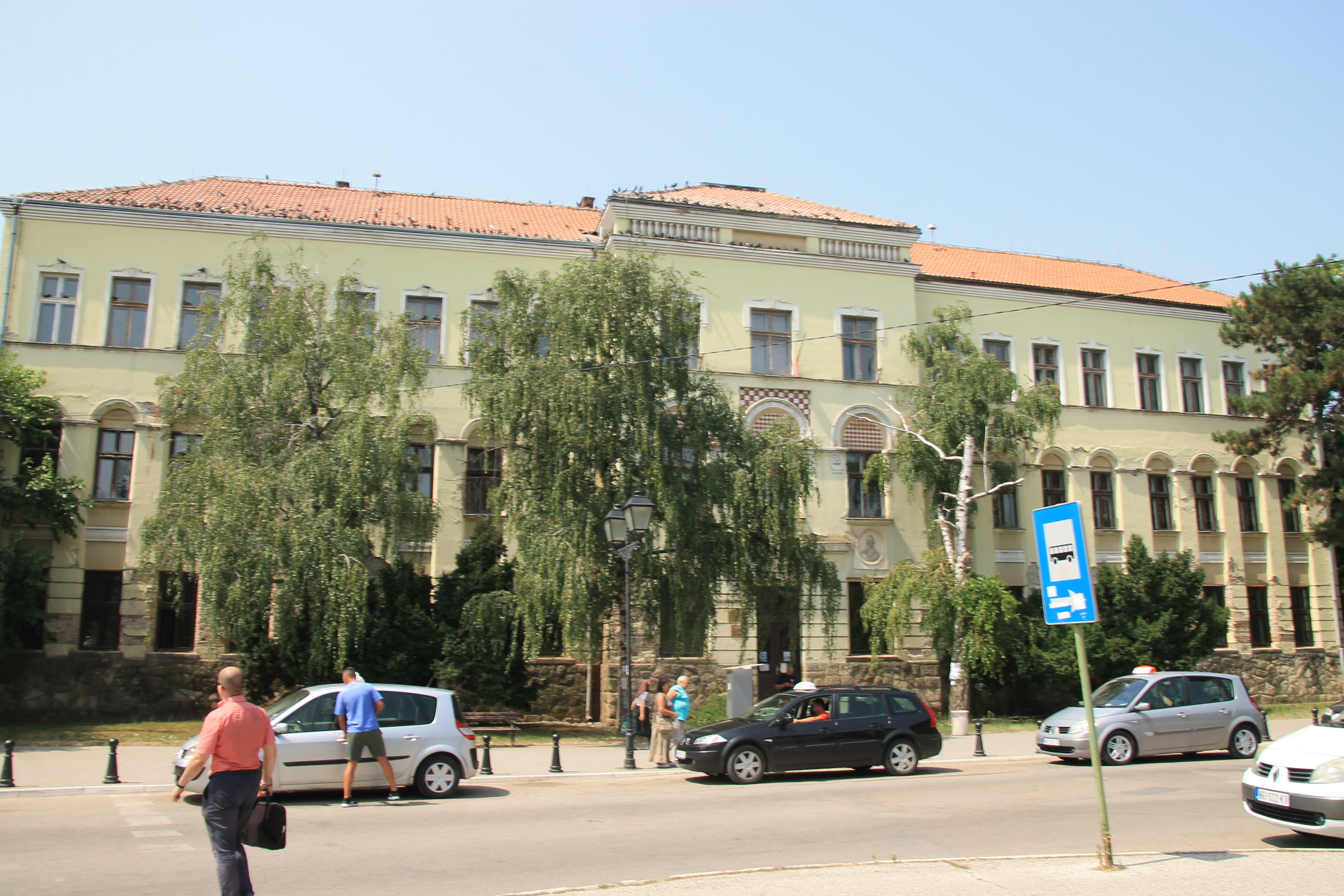
- Images from the Bor District

- Location of district in Serbia
- Coordinates: 44°5′N 22°6′E
- Country: Serbia
- Administrative center: Bor

Government
  - Commissioner: Miroslav Knežević

Area
  - Total: 3,507 km^{2} (1,354 sq mi)

Population (2022 census)
  - Total: 101,100
  - Density: 29.4/km^{2} (76/sq mi)
- ISO 3166 code: RS-14
- Municipalities: 4
- Settlements: 90
  - Cities and towns: 6
  - Villages: 84
- Website: borski.okrug.gov.rs

The Bor District (Serbian: Борски округ, romanized: Borski okrug, pronounced [bôːrskiː ôkruːɡ]) is one of the administrative districts of Serbia. According to the 2022 census, it has a population of 101,100 inhabitants. This district is the easternmost administrative district of Serbia and contains the Serbian panhandle that extends into the border with Romania. The administrative center of the Bor District is the city of Bor.

== History ==
The present-day administrative districts (including Bor District) were established in 1992 by the decree of the Government of Serbia.

== Cities and municipalities ==
The Bor District encompasses the territories of one city and three municipalities:

- Bor (city)
- Kladovo (municipality)
- Majdanpek (municipality)
- Negotin (municipality)

== Demographics ==
Historical population
Year	Pop.	±%
1948	144,049	—
1953	151,973	+5.5%
1961	160,096	+5.3%
1971	175,848	+9.8%
1981	180,463	+2.6%
1991	178,718	−1.0%
2002	146,551	−18.0%
2011	124,992	−14.7%
2022	101,100	−19.1%

=== Towns ===
There are two towns with over 10,000 inhabitants.

- Bor: 28,822
- Negotin: 14,647

=== Ethnic structure ===
Ethnicity	Population	Share
Serbs	77,956	77.1%
Vlachs	8,190	8.1%
Roma	1,805	1.8%
Others	4,192	4.1%
Undeclared/Unknown	10,697	10.6%

== See also ==
- Administrative districts of Serbia
- Administrative divisions of Serbia
