= Trajan's Bridge =

Roman segmental arch bridge over the lower Danube

Trajan's Bridge Latin: Pons Traiani Romanian: Podul lui Traian Serbian: Трајанов мост / Trajanov most
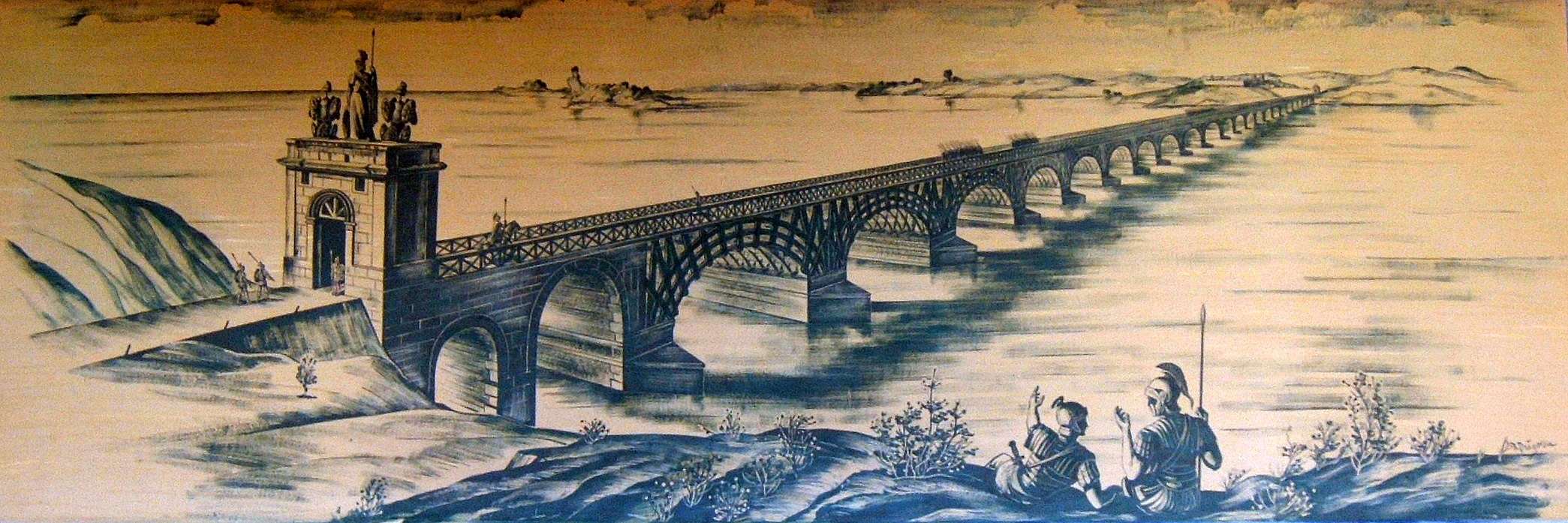
- Artistic reconstruction (1907)
- Coordinates: 44.623769°N 22.66705°E
- Crossed: Danube
- Locale: Drobeta-Turnu Severin (Romania), Kladovo (Serbia)
- Heritage status: Historic Monument (Romania); Monuments of Culture of Exceptional Importance, and Archaeological Sites of Exceptional Importance (Serbia)

Characteristics
- Material: Wood, stone
- Total length: 1,135 m (3,724 ft)
- Width: 15 m (49 ft)
- Height: 19 m (62 ft)
- No. of spans: 20 masonry pillars

History
- Architect: Apollodorus of Damascus
- Construction start: 103 AD
- Construction end: 105 AD
- Collapsed: Superstructure destroyed by Aurelian around 270 AD

Statistics

Cultural Heritage of Serbia
- Official name: Pontes with Trajan's Bridge
- Type: Archeological Site of Exceptional Importance
- Designated: 28 March 1981
- Reference no.: AN 44

Monument istoric
- Official name: Podul lui Traian
- Designated: 2004
- Reference no.: MH-I-m-A-10047.04

Location
- Interactive map of Trajan's Bridge

Trajan's Bridge (Romanian: Podul lui Traian; Serbian: Трајанов мост, romanized: Trajanov most), also called Bridge of Apollodorus over the Danube, was a Roman segmental arch bridge, on the modern Serbian–Romanian border, the first bridge to be built over the lower Danube and considered one of the greatest achievements in Roman architecture. Though it was functional for only 165 years, it is often considered to have been the longest arch bridge in both total span and length for more than 1,000 years.

The bridge was completed in 105 AD and designed by Emperor Trajan's architect Apollodorus of Damascus before the Second Dacian War to allow Roman troops to cross the river. Fragmentary ruins of the bridge's piers are still in existence.

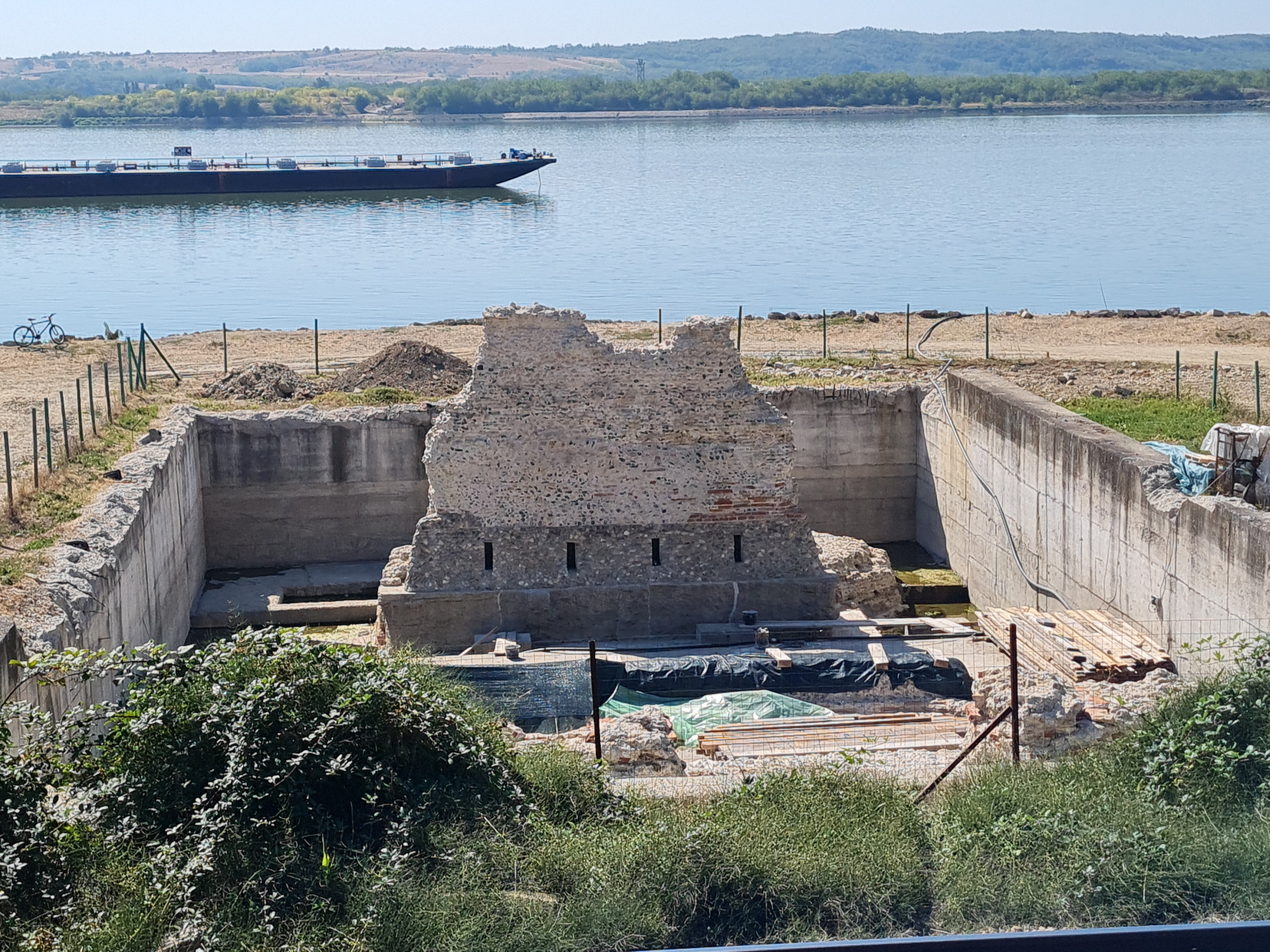
Trajan's Bridge northern bank

== Site ==
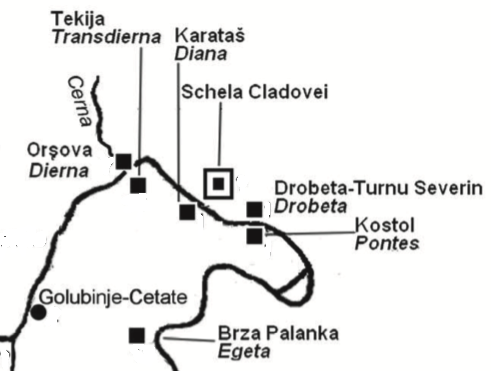
Forts on the Danube near Drobeta

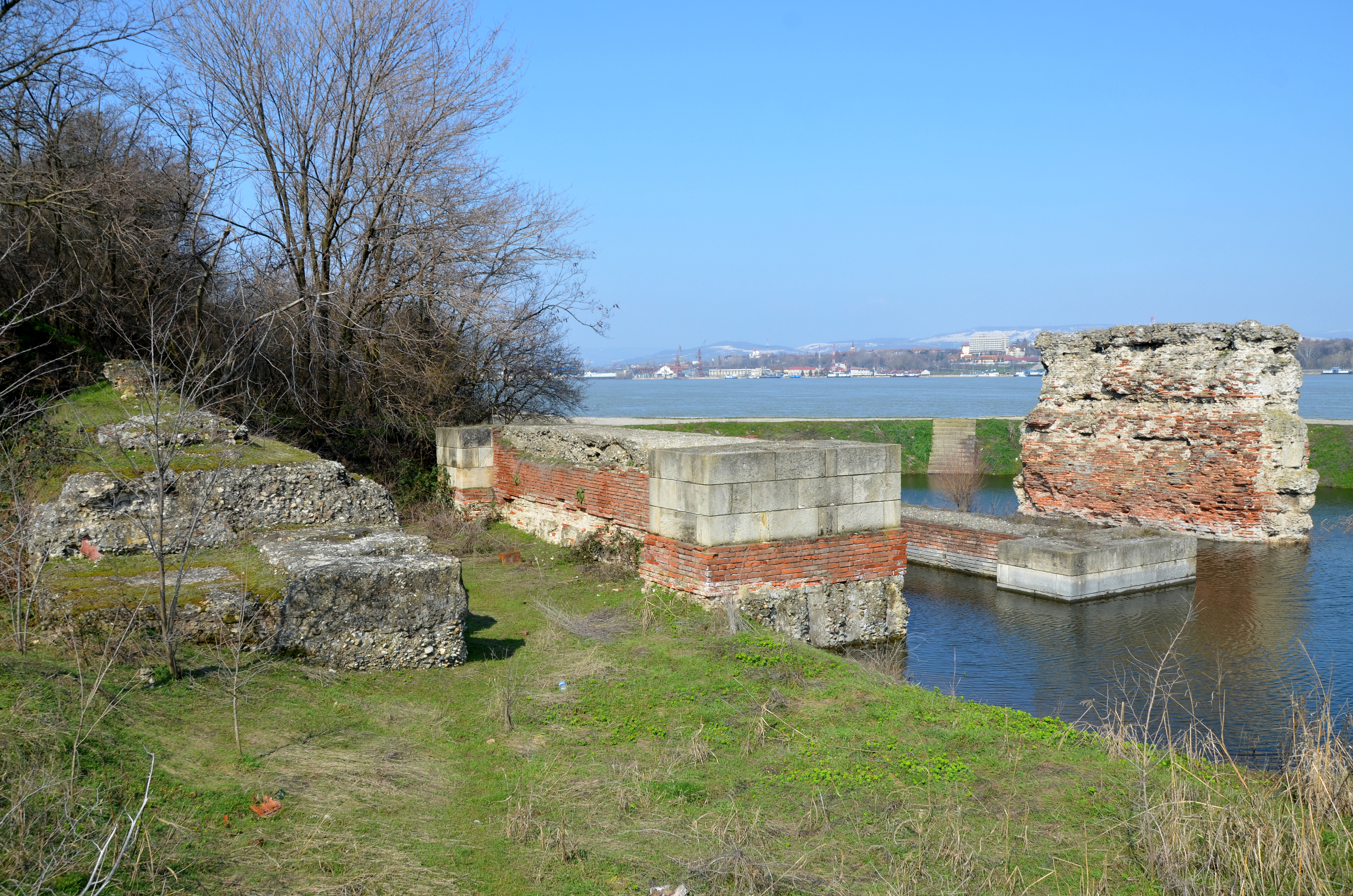
Remains of Trajan's Bridge on the south bank of the River Danube, Serbia

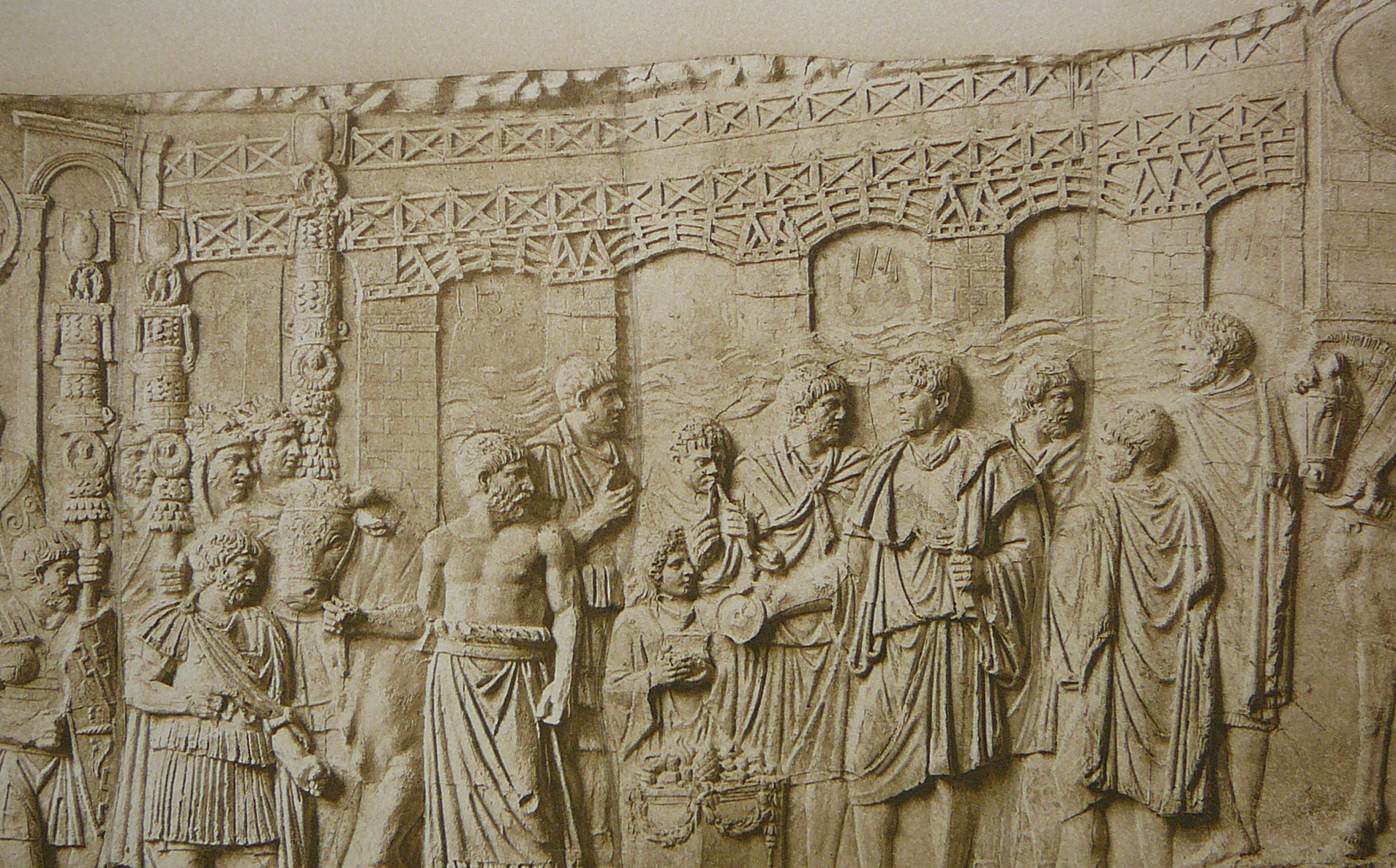
Relief of the bridge on Trajan's Column showing the unusually flat segmental arches on high-rising concrete piers; in the foreground emperor Trajan sacrificing by the Danube

The bridge was situated east of the Iron Gates, near the present-day cities of Drobeta-Turnu Severin in Romania and Kladovo in Serbia. Its construction was ordered by the Emperor Trajan as a supply route for the Roman legions fighting in Dacia.

Construction of the bridge was part of a wider project, which included the digging of side canals so that whitewater rapids could be avoided to make the Danube safer for navigation enabling an effective river fleet, a string of defense posts and development of the intelligence service on the border.

The remains of the embankment which protected the area during the construction of the canal (in a loop to the south of the Danube) show the magnitude of the works. The 3.2 km (2.0 mi) long canal bypassed the problematic section of the river in an arch-like style. Former canals eventually filled with sand, and empty shells are regularly found in the ground.

All these works, especially the bridge, served the purpose of preparing for the Roman invasion of Dacia, which ended with Roman victory in 106 AD. The effect of finally defeating the Dacians and acquiring their gold mines was so great that Roman games celebrating the conquest lasted for 123 days, with 10,000 gladiators engaging in fights and 11,000 wild animals being killed during that period.

The bridge was 1,135 m (3,724 ft) long (the Danube is now 800 m (2,600 ft) wide in that area), 15 m (49 ft) wide, and 19 m (62 ft) high, measured from the surface of the river. At each end was a Roman fort so that crossing the bridge was only possible through the camps.

On the south bank, at the modern village of Kostol near Kladovo, the Pontes fort was built in 103, concurrently with the bridge, occupying several hectares. Remnants of the 40 m (130 ft) long castrum with thick ramparts are still visible today. A vicus (civilian settlement) grew up around it later. A bronze head of Emperor Trajan has been discovered in Pontes, part of a statue which was erected at the bridge entrance and is today kept in the National Museum in Belgrade.

On the north bank is the Drobeta fort. It also had a bronze statue of Trajan.

== Design and construction ==
Apollodorus used wooden arches, each spanning 38 m (125 ft), set on twenty masonry pillars made of bricks, mortar, and pozzolana cement. It was built unusually quickly (between 103 and 105), employing the construction of a wooden caisson for each pier.

Apollodorus applied the technique of river flow relocation, using the principles set by Thales of Miletus some six centuries beforehand. Engineers waited for a low water level to dig a canal, west of the modern downtown of Kladovo. The water was redirected 2 km (1.2 mi) downstream from the construction site, through the lowland of Ključ region, to the location of the modern village of Mala Vrbica. Wooden pillars were driven into the river bed in a rectangular layout, which served as the foundation for the supporting piers, which were coated with clay. The hollow piers were filled with stones held together by mortar, while from the outside they were built around with Roman bricks. The bricks can still be found around the village of Kostol, retaining the same physical properties that they had 2 millennia ago. The piers were 44.46 m (145.9 ft) tall, 17.78 m (58.3 ft) wide and 50.38 m (165.3 ft) apart. It is considered today that the bridge construction was assembled on the land and then installed on the pillars. A mitigating circumstance was that the year the relocating canals were dug was very dry and the water level was quite low. The river bed was almost completely drained when the foundation of the pillars began. There were 20 pillars in total in an interval of 50 m (160 ft). Oak wood was used and the bridge was high enough to allow ship transport on the Danube.

The bricks also have a historical value, as the members of the Roman legions and cohorts which participated in the construction of the bridge carved the names of their units into the bricks. Thus, it is known that work was done by the legions of IV Flavia Felix, VII Claudia, V Macedonica and XIII Gemina and the cohorts of I Cretum, II Hispanorum, III Brittonum and I Antiochensium.

== Destruction and remains ==
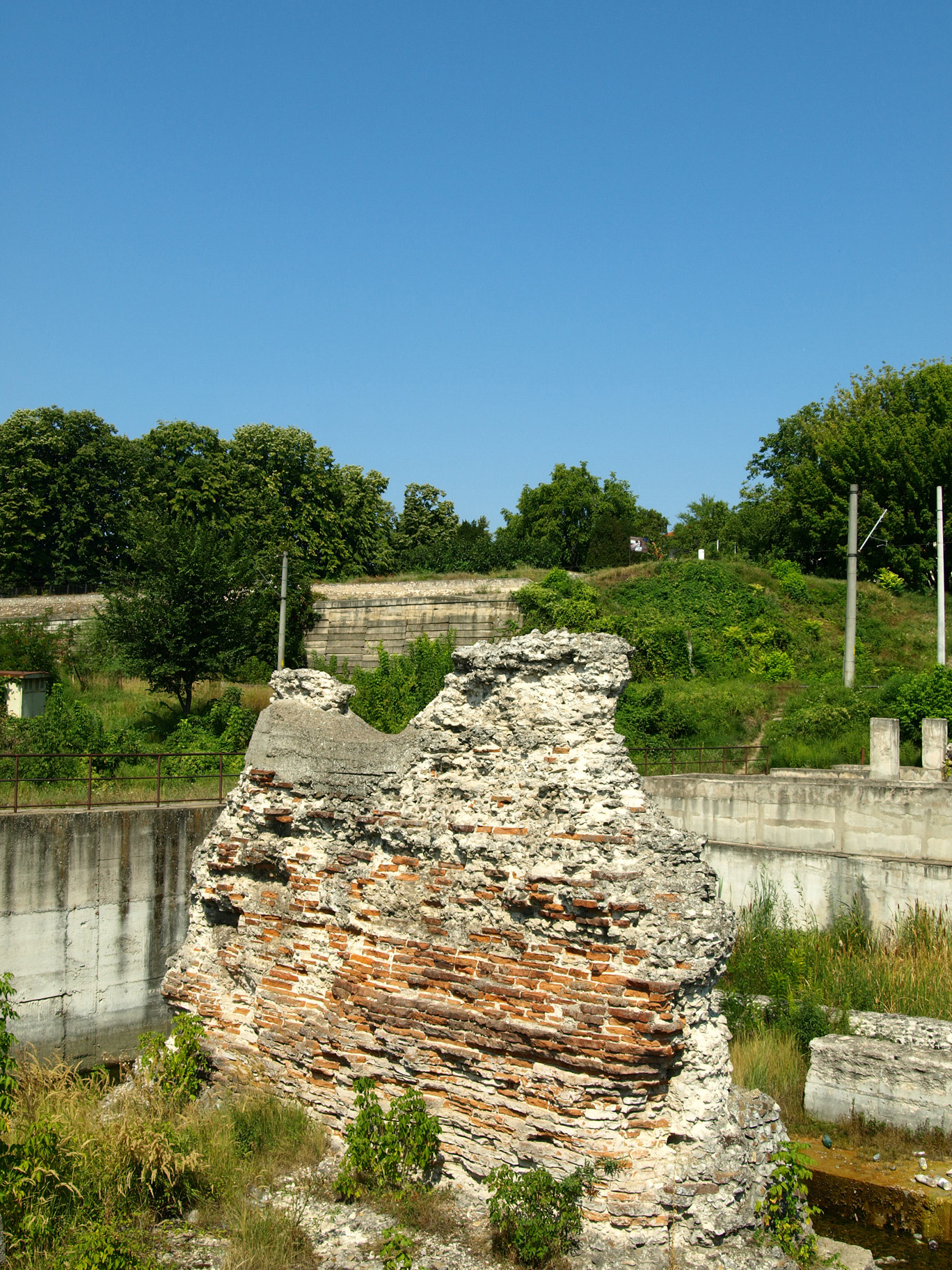
The ruins in 2009, surrounded by a square concrete compound which was built to protect the monument from the rise of the water level following the construction of the Iron Gate II dam, Romania

The wooden superstructure of the bridge was dismantled by Trajan's successor, Hadrian, presumably in order to protect the empire from barbarian invasions from the north. The superstructure was destroyed by fire.

The remains of the bridge reappeared in 1858 when the level of the Danube hit a record low due to the extensive drought. The twenty pillars were still visible.

In 1906, the Commission of the Danube decided to destroy two of the pillars that were obstructing navigation.

In 1932, there were 16 pillars remaining underwater, but in 1982 only 12 were mapped by archaeologists; the other four had probably been swept away by water. Only the entrance pillars are now visible on either bank of the Danube, one in Romania and one in Serbia.

In 1979, Trajan's Bridge was added to the Monument of Culture of Exceptional Importance, and in 1983 on Archaeological Sites of Exceptional Importance list, and by that it is protected by the Republic of Serbia.

Trajan's Bridge is listed as a Historic Monument of Romania since 2004 under the LMI code MH-I-m-A-10047.04.

A comparison of the side elevation of the Trajan's Bridge to the side elevations of some of the most notable bridges around the world on the same scale (see also interactive version)

== See also ==
- Roman Dacia
- List of inscriptions in Serbia
- List of Roman bridges
- Trajan's Dacian Wars
- Constantine's Bridge (Danube)
- Luigi Ferdinando Marsigli
