= Caviar of Kladovo =

Caviar formerly produced in eastern Serbia

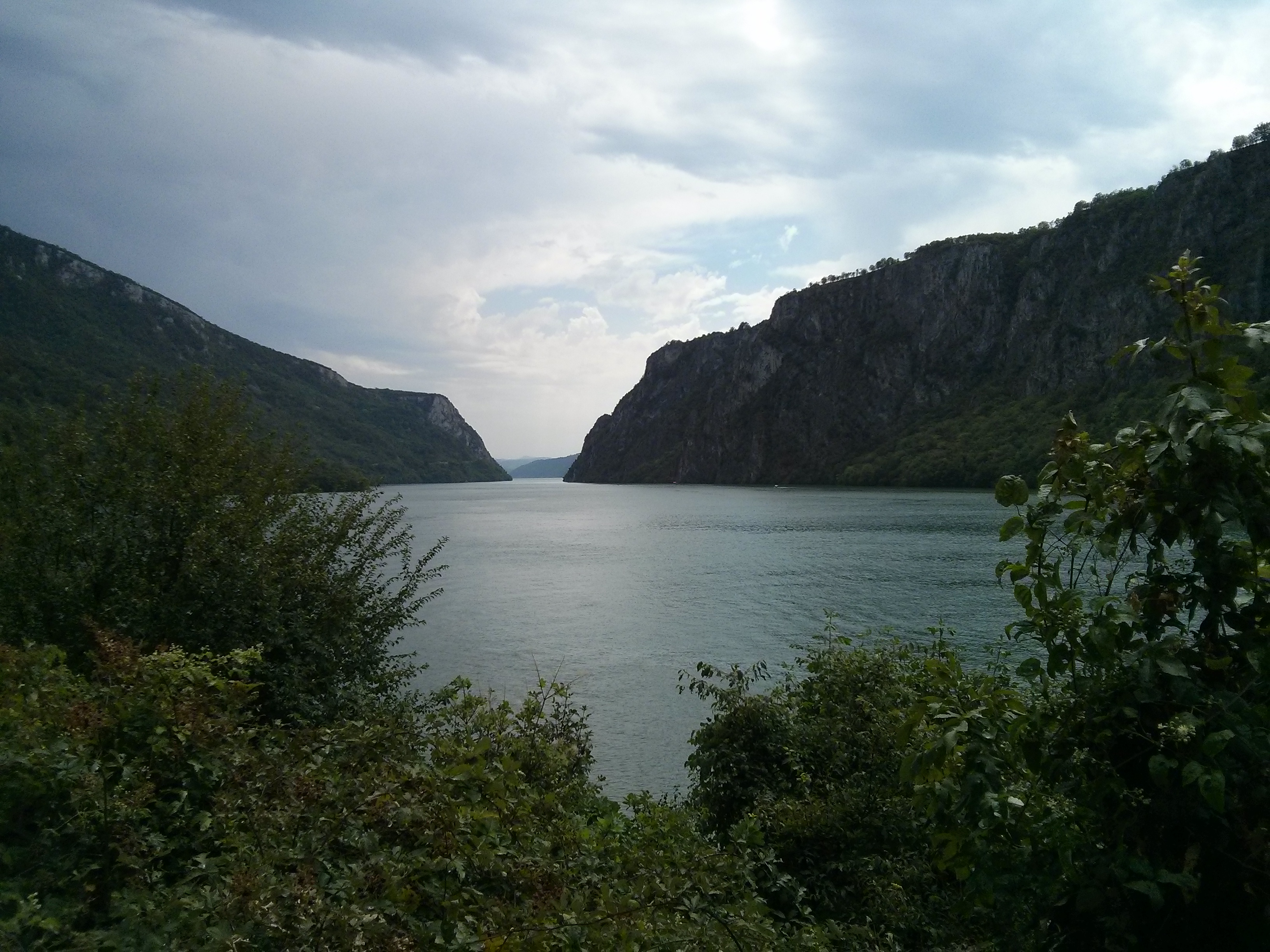
The Iron Gates Gorge, today flooded by the artificial lake, was an ancient beluga spawning ground.

The Caviar of Kladovo (Serbian: кладовски кавијар / kladovski kavijar) was a type of caviar produced in eastern Serbia. It was named after the town of Kladovo, in Central Serbia, part of the Danube's Iron Gates Gorge between Serbia and Romania. Made from various fishes' roe, the caviar was granted the protected geographic designation and was considered an expensive delicacy, which was even served on the RMS Titanic. With the construction of large dams in 1972 (Iron Gate I Hydroelectric Power Station) and 1984 (Iron Gate II Hydroelectric Power Station), jointly by the two states, the fish migrating from the Black Sea upstream the Danube were prevented from reaching their old spawning areas, and production of caviar was discontinued in the 21st century.

Due to its black color, glassy and pearly shine, separate and toned roe without the membrane, surrounded by its own natural oil, it was called the "Black Pearl of Kladovo".

== History ==
=== Origin ===
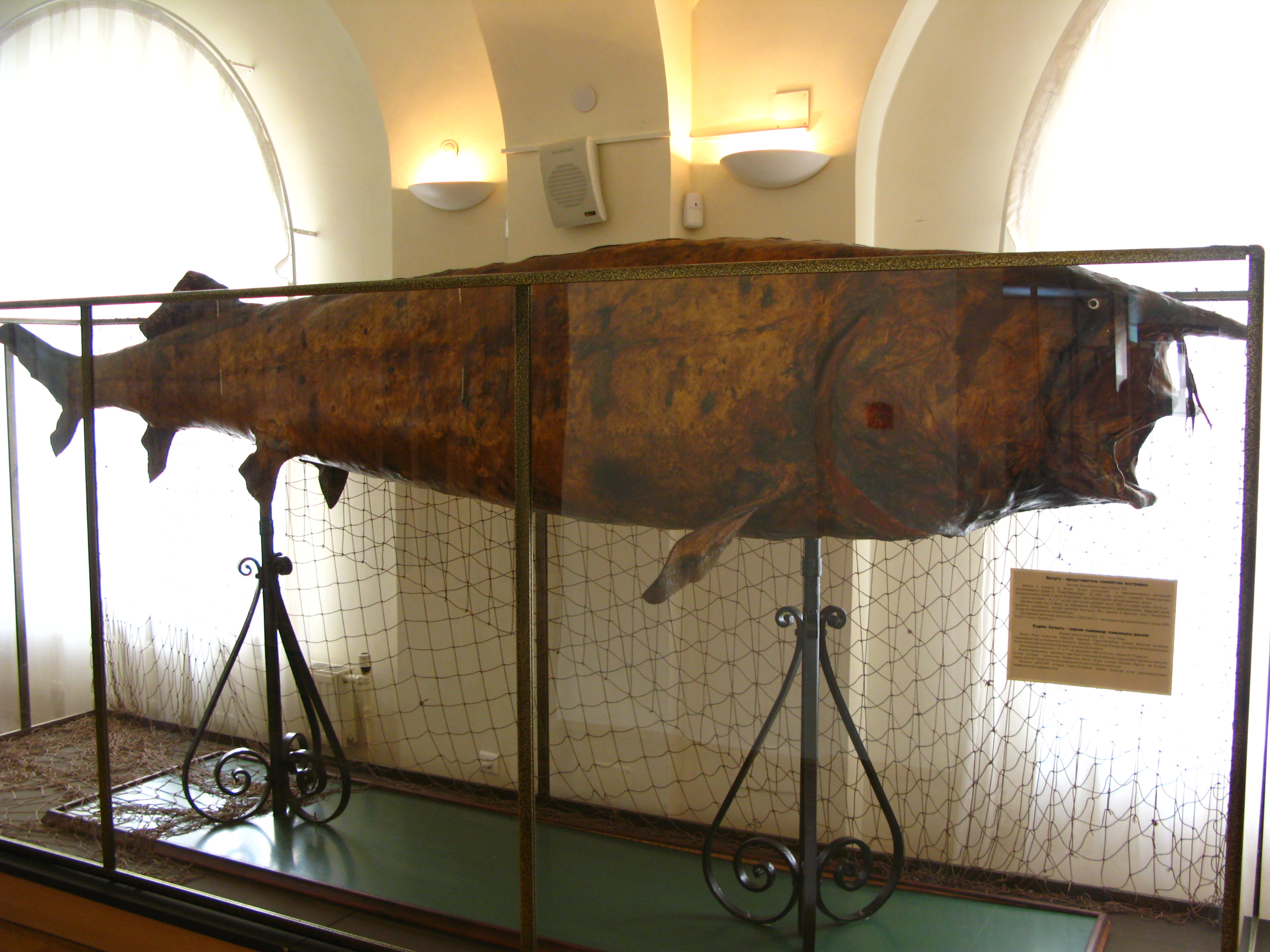
Exhibited beluga in Russia. Today much smaller and on the brink of extinction, they used to be up to 7 m (23 ft) long and weighed 700 kg (1,500 lb)

The fishes lived in the Black Sea, in the salt water, until reaching sexual maturity. They would then embark on the journey upstream the Danube, to lay eggs in the fresh water. The spawning required specific conditions: water temperature from 12 to 14 °C (54 to 57 °F), depth from 15 to 40 m (49 to 131 ft), and rock and gravel riverbed. These conditions were met in the Iron Gates gorge, and the main spawning area spread between the modern small towns of Golubac and Radujevac.

Catch of the sturgeons in the Danube's Iron Gates Gorge area was recorded 2,000 years ago, during the Roman rule in the area. As for the caviar itself, historical records show that the black caviar was produced in the lower Danube valley at least since the 15th century. German-Austrian official Friedrich Wilhelm von Taube visited the region in 1776–1777 and noted that the fishermen eat beluga's fresh meat and eggs, a "well known ajvar", while the salted eggs they sell to the outsiders but they don't know to salt them properly. He considered that if they would know how to preserve them right, with all the bounty of fish, they would push from the Austrian market English and Dutch fish. Lack of proper preservative actually made the caviar an everyday food of poor fishermen, with only small amount being shipped via Danube to Belgrade, and further to Vienna and Pest. Though the locals ate raw eggs, without salt, they used other spices.

As sturgeons could grow up to 7 m (23 ft) at the time, they couldn't be fished like other species. Construction called garda (plural garde) was used for catching them. It was a trap made of logs, trunks and planks. They were placed during the low water level in the form of two parallel fences on the rapids, in front of the gravel barrier islands where the sturgeons would come to spawn. Operator of the garda was called gardadžija. The openings at the starting, upstream sections were 20 to 80 m (66 to 262 ft) wide, while at the downstream end, the opening was 3 to 4 m (9.8 to 13.1 ft). Behind it were the nets, so thick that they more resembled bags. Sturgeons were pushed by the water over the rapids into these artificial corridors, pushing them into the nets in the end. Best catch was on the rapids at the, now flooded, village of Sip, as only the largest and strongest fish could pass through them.

The owners of the garde were the Ottoman merchants from the, now also submerged, island of Ada Kaleh. This didn't change even after the 1815 Second Serbian Uprising, when Serbia achieved autonomy within the Ottoman Empire. In the 1830s, Serbian ruling prince Miloš Obrenović bought off all the garde and began to rent them to the local fishermen. The fishermen were also leasing parts of the river where to fish. The concessions were awarded by the local parishes, for an annual fee (Donji Milanovac, Kladovo, Korbovo, Brza Palanka, Radujevac).

There were two additional methods of fishing sturgeons. Nets, called setke, were also used. They were specially adapted nets which closed on their own when full. The setke were placed under the bottoms of the special fishing boats (pram) and were used for fishing in major whirlpools. Third method included the "sturgeon pole" called pampurača or takum during the Ottoman period. Considered the most brutal, it became the major method used by the mid-20th century. The pole was dotted with hooks and was placed along the underwater rocks where the sturgeons would scratch to lose parasites. The pole was kept under water by the large stones attached to it on one side, while on the other it had floating corks ("pampur", hence the name), pieces of polystyrene, or gourds, attached on the ropes. Sometimes anchors, up to 15 kilograms (33 lb) heavy, were used instead, or as additions to the stones, which kept the pole underwater. These ballasts were attached at both endings of the pole, and at its middle, while the floating ropes with hooks were up to 100 metres (330 ft) long.

Belgian historian Émile de Borchgrave mentions production of the black caviar in Kladovo and Radujevac in 1883. By this time, the caviar still wasn't highly regarded by the local population. Process of producing it still included only salting - the roe was kept for several days in salty water, strained and packed in small wooden barrels. But, the caviar already reached the Serbian royal court. Menu from 2 August 1893 shows it was served to the guests of king Alexander Obrenović.

=== Golden age ===
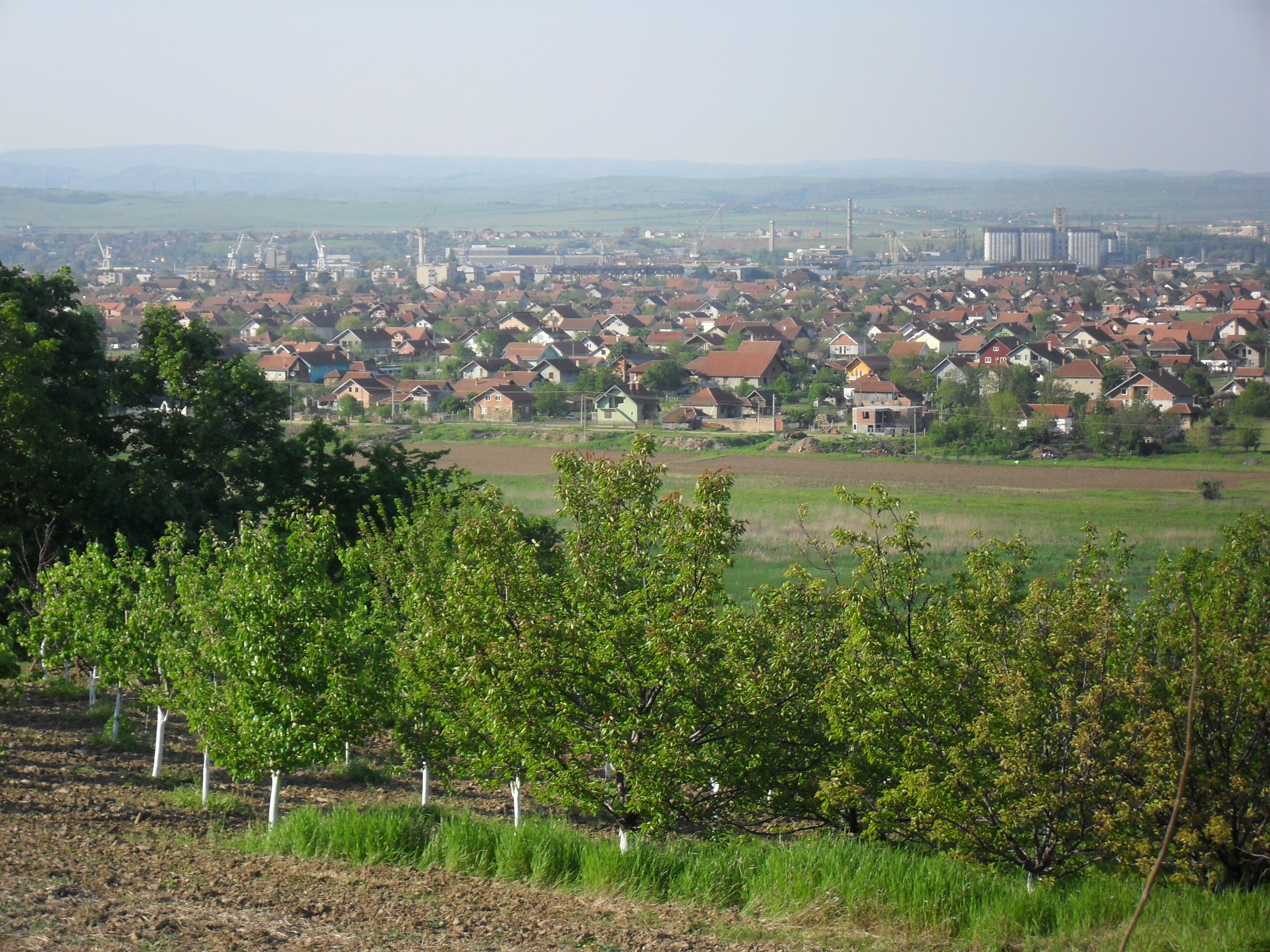
Town of Kladovo, which gave name to the caviar

Major improvement was achieved only after the October Revolution and World War I, when the large number of Russian White émigrés arrived in Serbia. Among them were several experts on caviar production. Several Russian families settled along the Iron Gates gorge. They rented the garde and made the deal with the local fishermen to work for them, while the renters will get part of the catch. Among the technologists was Sergey Milogradov who introduced the specific technology for the caviar of Kladovo, including, still secret, formula for the preservation powder. He passed his knowledge to the family of count Deinega, who was succeeded by his daughter Vera Deinega. The Russians introduced their technology, including the dry method, though later, in the Soviet Union, they returned to the wet method, and established distribution routes to Europe.

Organized production began in 1920. The roe was sifted without subsequent adding of water or salt, with the addition of the secret preservation powder. It was then kept for 6 to 12 months in wooden barrels which contained 3 kg (6.6 lb) of product. The barrels themselves were kept in ledenice, 4 to 5 m (13 to 16 ft) deep ice-filled holes in the ground, covered with planks, straw and earth. The process and quality were improved in the next decades, so after a period of time it was considered autochthonous method of production, even though it originated from Russia.

Vera Deinega made the powder at her house in Zemun and was selling it to the state owned "Đerdap Fishery", which produced the caviar. The fishery, established in 1947, was purchasing up to 100 kg (220 lb) and was the only company which made it. In time, the fishery developed in one of the largest in Serbia. In 1968, shortly before her death, Deinega disclosed the formula to the fishery's management. In the 1960s, up to 3 tons of caviar yearly was exported from Kladovo. Record catch from that period is a 188 kg (414 lb) heavy sturgeon with 20 kg (44 lb) of the roe in it. However, the records from the past, dated in 1793, report of the sturgeon which had 500 kg (1,100 lb).

Post-war export started in 1968. The caviar was exported as a delicacy to France, Italy, Germany, Switzerland, Greece and the United States. At one point, it was more expensive than the Russian or Iranian caviar. In the 1980s it had a price of $900 per kilogram, or double compared to the Iranian caviar which was considered the closest to the Kladovo caviar in terms of quality. For 27 years, the main exporter of the Kladovo caviar was merchant Gerald M. Stein from New York, through his "Caviar House" and "Iron Gate" companies. He asked to be offered first for all the produced caviar and was regularly purchasing up to 1.5 ton of caviar yearly. His "Iron Gate" company was Macy's main caviar supplier. Stein's parents were among the Russians who emigrated to America via Serbia, passing through Kladovo. Several of his family members perished in the notorious Kladovo transport in World War II. Stein invested lots in the business, with Serbian newspapers reporting that he managed to acquire the advertisement in the hit American soap Dynasty, where character Alexis Colby, represented as the connoisseur of the caviar, was portrayed as acquiring this brand.

The caviar was also smuggled out of Serbia. There were two main routes. One was via airplanes, in the form of packages. The other was across the Danube, into Romania, at the village of Brnjica.

=== Decline ===
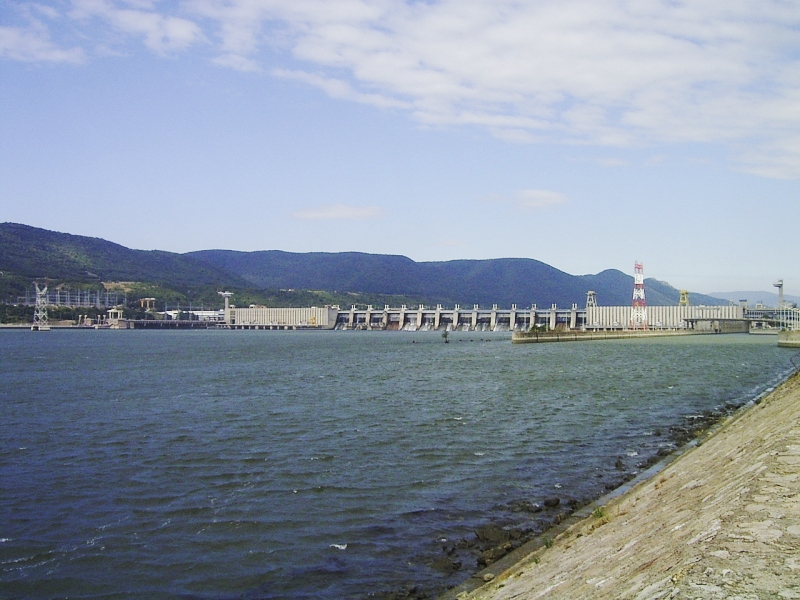
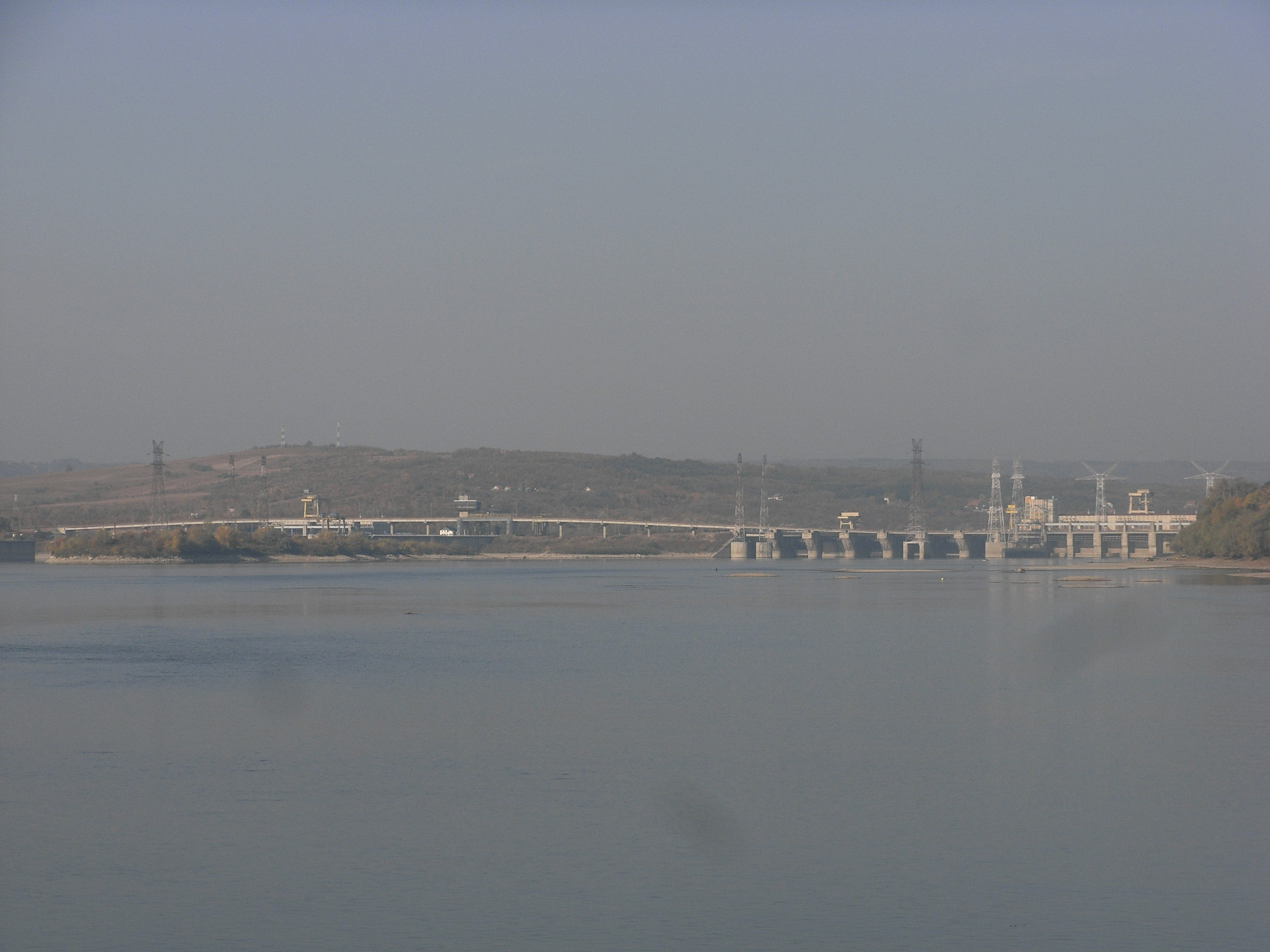
The dams Iron Gate I (left) and Iron Gate II (right), by 1984 completely blocked the sturgeons from reaching the gorge

Two large hydroelectric dams were built on the Danube from the 1960s to the 1980s. Construction of the Iron Gate I Hydroelectric Power Station began in 1964 and was completed in 1972, while the Iron Gate II Hydroelectric Power Station was built from 1977 to 1984. The engineers completely disregarded the construction of fish ladder, so the dams blocked all species of large sturgeons to migrate upstream to their old spawning areas. Other negative effects of the dams include higher fluctuations of the water level, backwater, erosion, climate changes and deposits of pebble and gravel on the previously rocky riverbed, which is more suitable for the spawning of the fishes in question. With some other environmental issues around the Europe, this was part of the cause for the massive decrease in the number of all species of sturgeons, bringing them to the brink of extinction.

The first dam blocked the river at the 943 km (586 mi). After 1984 and the second dam at the 863 km (536 mi), the sturgeons could only reach the section between the mouth of the Timok and the Iron Gate II dam, or 17.4 km (10.8 mi) of open waterway in Serbia. They began to spawn at the base of the dam, as the water downstream was getting polluted at Prahovo due to the town's chemical industry. Also, some 200 sunken German ships from World War II by the Soviet Danube Flotilla, provided shelter for the entire shoals of fish. However, after 1984 the massive overfishing on the short, remaining waterway followed. It was even made worse in the 1990s, during the period of international sanctions imposed on Serbia, when illegal fishing also blossomed.

In 1991, a 2 km^{2} (0.77 sq mi) fish pond was created at the village of Mala Vrbica, 7 km (4.3 mi) downstream from Kladovo, on the very bank of the Danube. Purposes included artificial reproduction and spawning area of the sturgeons, for the planned re-population of the Danube's flow below the Iron Gate II dam. Fish stocking was conducted in 1994 and 1995.

However, the catch was continuously diminishing since the Danube was fully dammed in 1971. At that time, around 100 tons of caviar producing fish was caught. By 1984 and the second dam it fell to 20-25 tons, but after that collapsed completely. In 1999, only 1 ton was fished. Total catch from 1980 to 1999 was only 140 tons, or what was fished in a year and a half before 1971. By this time it was reported that the sturgeons are heading for the extinction. Accordingly, after the dams were built, production of the caviar started to dwindle, too. Total production was 1,033.22 kg (2,277.9 lb) in 1983, 427.09 kg (941.6 lb) in 1986, 1,485.6 kg (3,275 lb) in 1994 and 410.07 kg (904.0 lb) in 1998.

In 2009 it was reported that the production is shutting down, what followed soon when the company which produced it went bankrupt.

By 2017, Bulgaria, Romania and Serbia imposed the moratorium on fishing the roe-barring fish species. In the 2010s Romanian environmentalist suggested that fish ladders should be built on the dams by Romania and Serbia in an effort to save the sturgeons from extinction.

In 2021, Belgrade's Museum of Natural History organized an exhibition dedicated to caviar, with an emphasis on the Caviar of Kladovo.

== Characteristics ==
In Serbia, the caviar is also called "ajvar of Kladovo" (Serbian: кладовски ајвар / kladovski ajvar). It was made from the roe of beluga sturgeon, sterlet (produced only 1983–1989), starry sturgeon and Russian sturgeon. The decree on geographic designation stipulates that only roe from the fish caught between Danube's 845 km (525 mi) (mouth of the Timok river) and 1,075 km (668 mi) can be sold as the Caviar of Kladovo. The fishing area was designated as the "Danube IV" at the time.

The specificity of the Kladovo's caviar was that the roe gets "ripe" enough during the 850 km (530 mi) long journey of the fish from the Black Sea upstream the Danube. By this time, the roe reached its 4th and 5th stadium, meaning it contained all nutrients needed for the future offspring (proteins, fat, minerals, vitamins) as the spawning was imminent. Russian, Iranian, American and Chinese producers, for example, harvest roe during the 2nd or 3rd, so called green stadium. Also, roe was turned into the caviar using the dry method, which means the roe never came in touch with the water, and only the natural preservatives were used. As a result of this process, the caviar didn't smell like fish. Actually, it was odorless.

Other producers catch fish in the salty water which directly affects the color of the roe, keep the roe in salted water after sifting which degrades the overall quality and tonus of the roe, and add chemical preservatives, like sorbic acid, sodium sorbate, potassium sorbate and hexamethylenetetramine, or mixes of those. Chemical analysis of the caviar showed that it was highly valuable and rich energy food – 52,93% water, 22,15% proteins, 17,13% fats, 4,12% ash and 3,3% salt. It had pH of 7, which means it was neutral and had no trans fat to degrade its quality. During the process, the roe was stirred with goose feather. The Caviar of Kladovo belongs to the "malassol" type, which means it has low amount of salt. Other brands add more salt to correct the taste, which is why the caviar of Kladovo was considered to have a mild taste. Suggestion was to be taken out of the refrigerator 30 minutes before being served.

Characteristics of the four types of caviar of Kladovo are:

Caviar type	Native name	Color	Roe diameter	Percentage of total production (1980s)
Caviar of beluga sturgeon	Кавијар од моруне Kavijar od morune	Light grey to black, with pearly shine	3 to 4 mm (0.12 to 0.16 in)	71.9%
Caviar of Russian sturgeon	Кавијар од јесетре Kavijar od jesetre	Light to dark brown and dark grey to almost black	3 mm (0.12 in)	25.1%
Caviar of starry sturgeon	Кавијар од паструге Kavijar od pastruge	Light grey to dark grey, with green shine	2 mm (0.079 in)	2.3%
Caviar of sterlet	Кавијар од кечиге Kavijar od kečige	Green	1 mm (0.039 in)	0.4%

== Protection ==
The caviar was granted the protected geographic designation already during the period of the Socialist Federative Republic of Yugoslavia. This was confirmed in 2000. In 2020, the government announced new law on geographic designation which will stipulate that the product which is out of production for 7 years may lose its designation, which would affect the Kladovo caviar because its production has been discontinued.
