= Ljubičevac =

Ljubičevac is name of two places in Serbia:

- Ljubičevac (Kladovo), in Bor District
- Ljubičevac (Stragari), in Šumadija District
