= Kladušnica =

Kladušnica may refer to:

- Kladušnica, Serbia, a village near Bor
- Kladušnica (Glina), a tributary to the Glina in Bosnia
- Kladušnica (Danube), a tributary to the Danube in Serbia
