= Ad Pontes =

Ad Pontes (AD PONTES) is a Roman place name (pl. "at the bridges"). It may refer to:

- Staines, a town in England, UK, housing the Roman Staines Bridge
- Kladovo, a municipality-town in Eastern Serbia, housing the Roman Trajan's Bridge
