= Petrovo Selo (Kladovo) =

Petrovo Selo Петрово Село
- Village
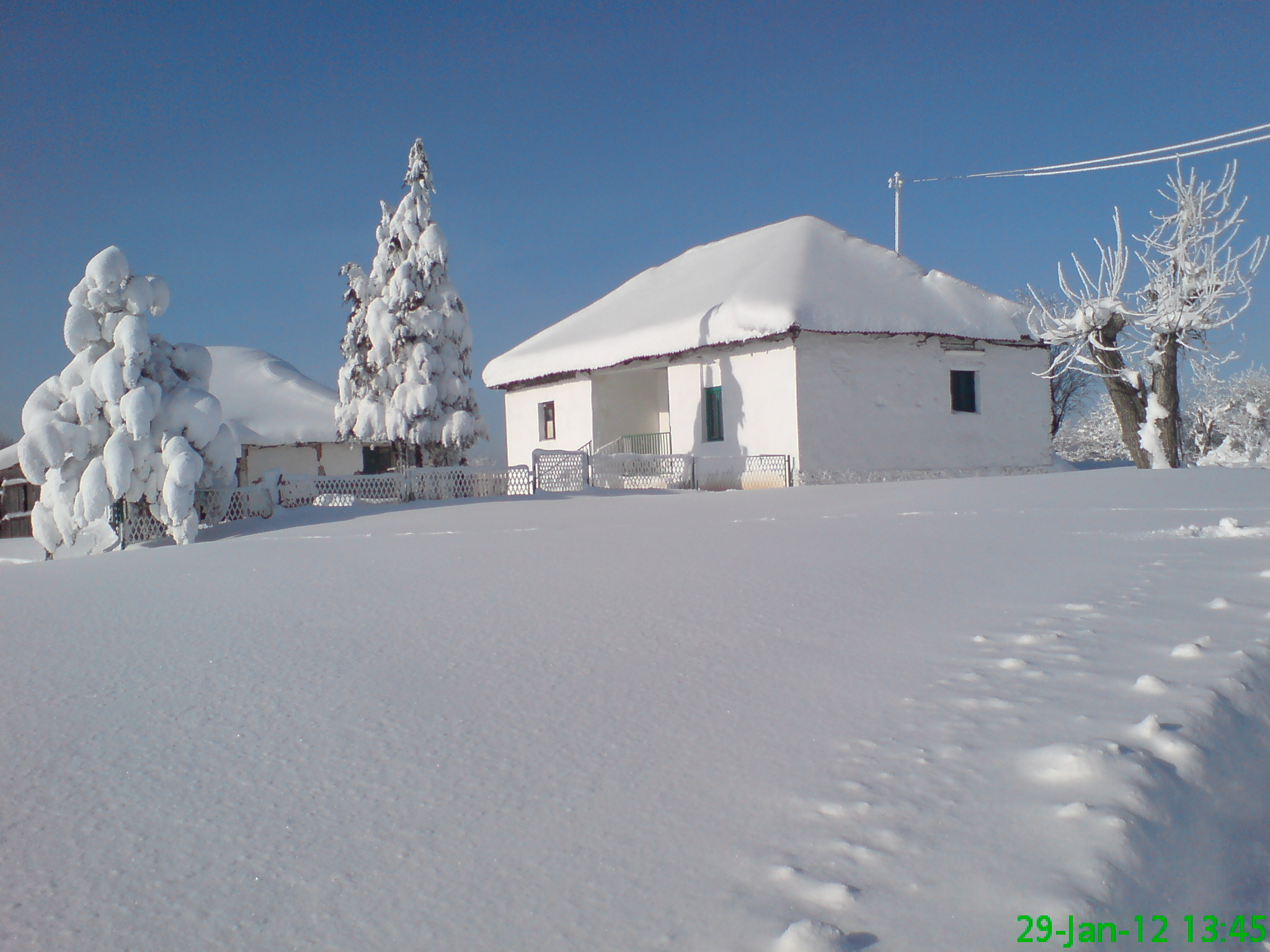

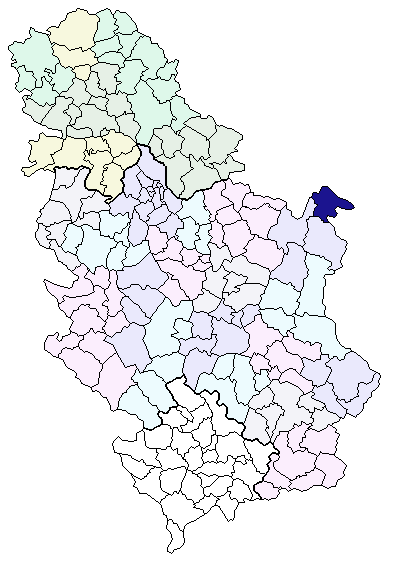
- Location of Kladovo Municipality in Serbia

- Location within Serbia
- Coordinates: 44°38′20″N 22°27′09″E
- Country: Serbia
- District: Bor District
- Municipality: Kladovo

Area
  - Total: 64.84 km^{2} (25.03 sq mi)
- Elevation: 413 m (1,355 ft)

Population (2011)
  - Total: 79
  - Density: 1.2/km^{2} (3.2/sq mi)
- Time zone: UTC+1 (CET)
  - Summer (DST): UTC+2 (CEST)

Petrovo Selo (Serbian Cyrillic: Петрово Село) is a village in the municipality of Kladovo, Serbia. According to the 2011 census results, the village has a population of 79 inhabitants.
