= Velika Kamenica =

Velika Kamenica Велика Каменица
- Village
- Nickname: Kamenica
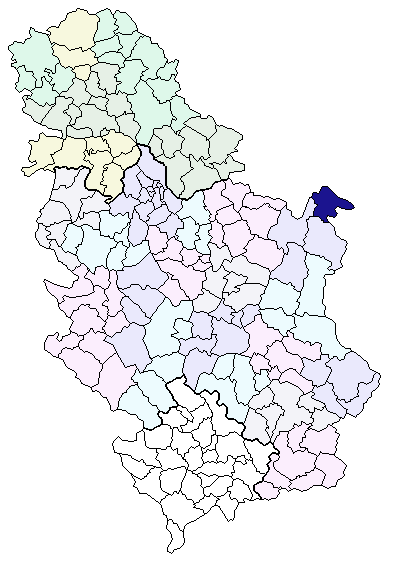
- Location of Kladovo Municipality in Serbia

- Location within Serbia
- Coordinates: 44°32′N 22°30′E
- Country: Serbia
- District: Bor District
- Municipality: Kladovo

Population (2022)
  - Total: 757
- Time zone: UTC+1 (CET)
  - Summer (DST): UTC+2 (CEST)

Velika Kamenica is a village in the municipality of Kladovo, Serbia. According to the 2002 census, the village has a population of 757 people.
