= Podvrška =

- Village
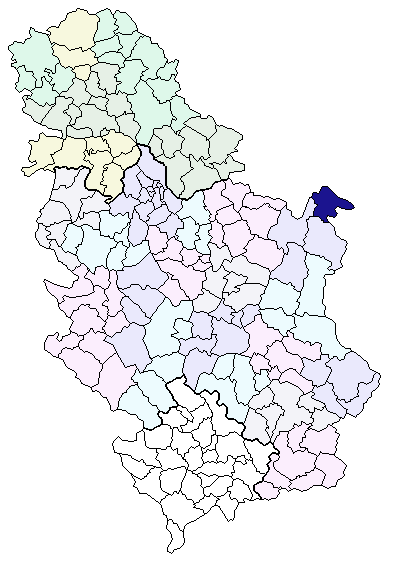
- Location of Kladovo Municipality in Serbia

- Location within Serbia
- Coordinates: 44°35′N 22°30′E
- Country: Serbia
- District: Bor District
- Municipality: Kladovo

Population (2002)
  - Total: 1,143
- Time zone: UTC+1 (CET)
  - Summer (DST): UTC+2 (CEST)

Podvrška is a village in the municipality of Kladovo, Serbia. According to the 2002 census, the village has a population of 1,143 people. By 2022, the population had declined to 734 people, of whom 84.47% were Serbs and 11.58% were Vlachs.
