= Davidovac, Kladovo =

Davidovac Давидовац
- Village
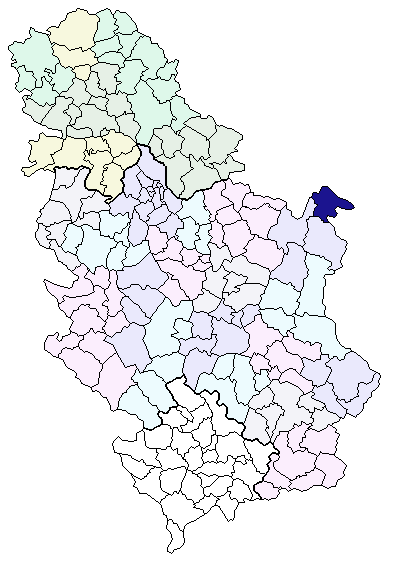
- Location of Kladovo Municipality in Serbia

- Location within Serbia
- Country: Serbia
- District: Bor District
- Municipality: Kladovo

Population (2022)
  - Total: 610
- Time zone: UTC+1 (CET)
  - Summer (DST): UTC+2 (CEST)

Davidovac is a village in the municipality of Kladovo, Serbia. According to the 2002 census, the village has a population of 610 people.
