= Vajuga =

Vajuga Вајуга
- Village
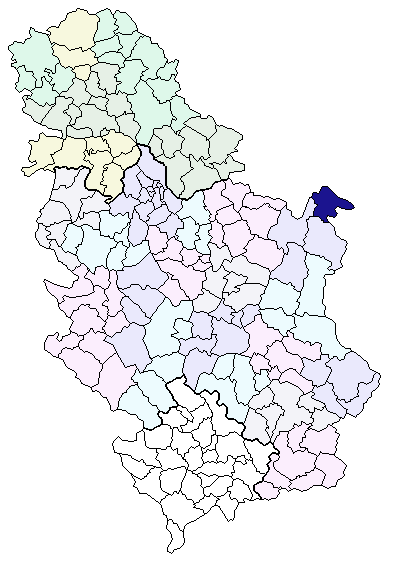
- Location of Kladovo Municipality in Serbia

- Location within Serbia
- Country: Serbia
- District: Bor District
- Municipality: Kladovo

Population (2022)
  - Total: 563
- Time zone: UTC+1 (CET)
  - Summer (DST): UTC+2 (CEST)

Vajuga (Serbian Cyrillic: Вајуга) is a village in Serbia in the municipality of Kladovo, in the district of Bor. In 2002, it had 563 inhabitants, of which the majority were Serbs.

A necropolis with burials, ceramics and metal items dating to 8th century BC was unearthed at the Vajuga locality.

== Demographics ==
=== Evolution of the population ===
- 1948 : 870
- 1953 : 929
- 1961 : 931
- 1971 : 1,002
- 1981 : 952
- 1991 : 843
- 2002 : 563.

=== Population statistics(2002) ===
- Serbs : 355 (63,05%)
- Romanians : 11 (1,95%)
- Yugoslavs : 3 (0,53%)
- Vlachs : 2 (0,35%)
- Unknown/Others.

== See also ==
- List of cities, towns and villages in Serbia (A-M)
- List of cities in Serbia
