= Velesnica =

Velesnica Велесница
- Village
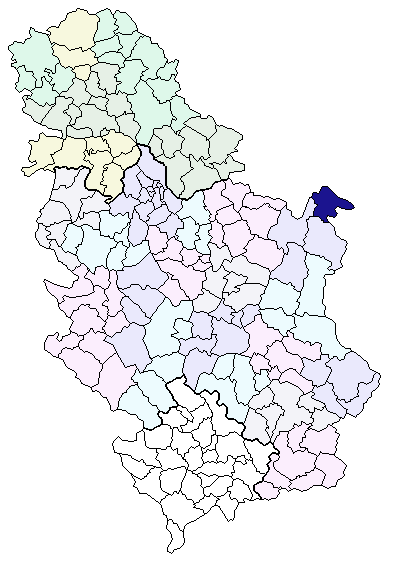
- Location of Kladovo Municipality in Serbia

- Location within Serbia
- Coordinates: 44°31′05″N 22°33′03″E
- Country: Serbia
- District: Bor District
- Municipality: Kladovo

Population (2002)
  - Total: 265
- Time zone: UTC+1 (CET)
  - Summer (DST): UTC+2 (CEST)
- Postal code: 19328

Velesnica is a village in the municipality of Kladovo, Serbia. According to the 2002 census, the village has a population of 265 people.
