= Korbovo =

Korbovo Корбово Corbova
- Village
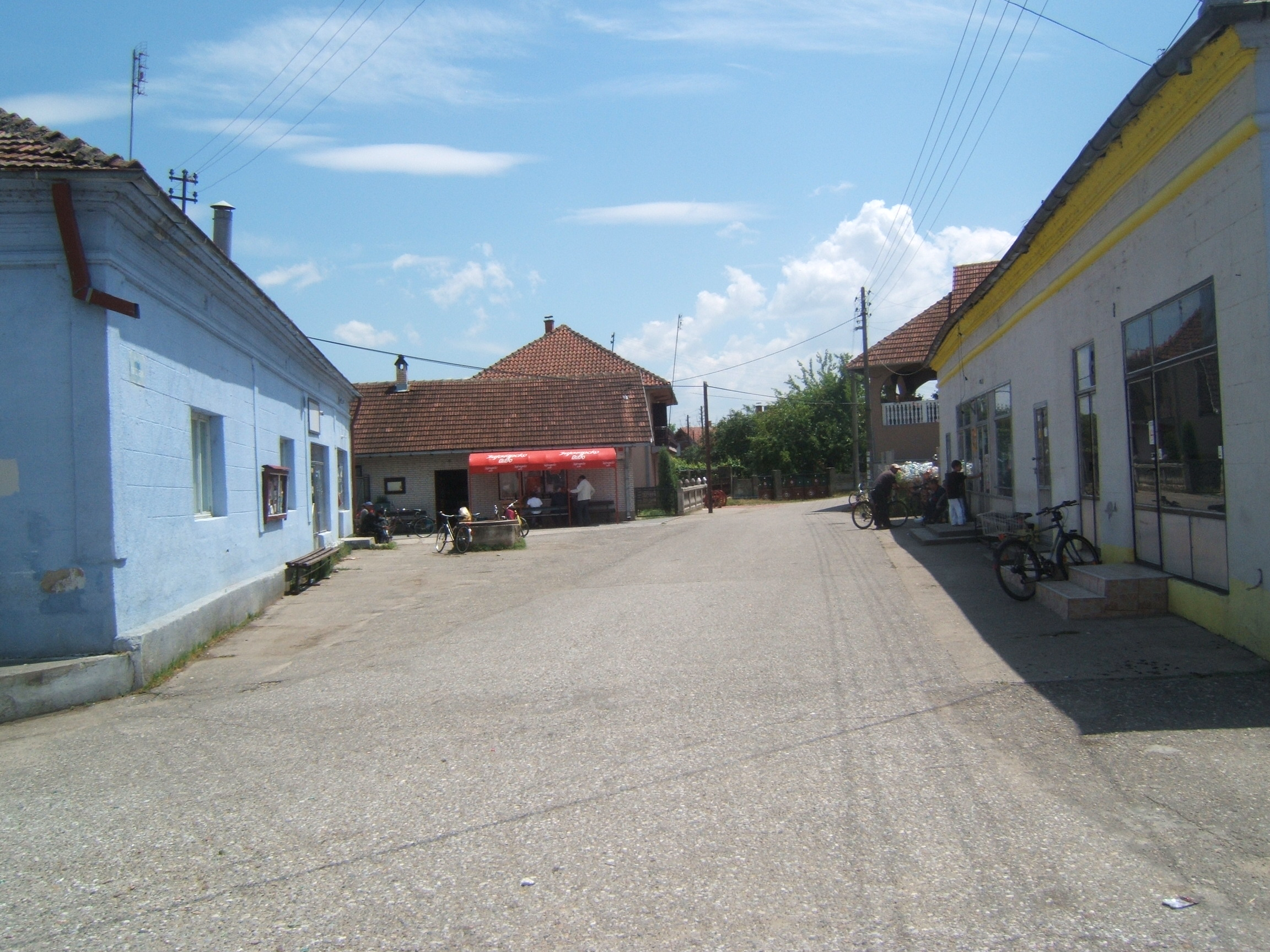
- Korbovo

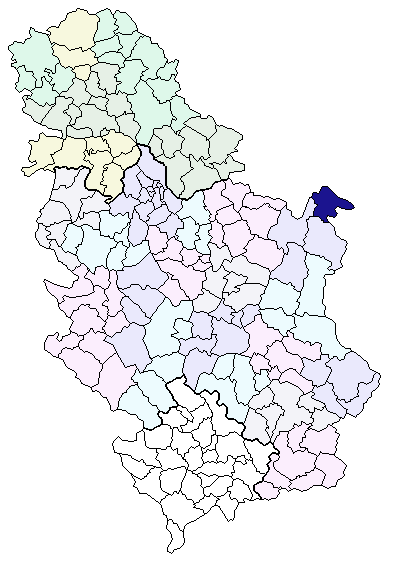
- Location of Kladovo Municipality in Serbia

- Location within Serbia
- Country: Serbia
- District: Bor District
- Municipality: Kladovo

Population (2002)
  - Total: 1,067
- Time zone: UTC+1 (CET)
  - Summer (DST): UTC+2 (CEST)

Korbovo (Serbian: Корбово; Romanian: Corbova) is a village in the municipality of Kladovo, Serbia. According to the 2002 census, the village has a population of 1067 people. Korbovo can be reached from Kladovo or from Rtkovo. Due to the economic crisis in Serbia, most of the inhabitants of Korbovo live abroad or in larger cities and return only for Holidays. It also borders Ostrovu Corbului, Romania, and is close to the Romanian-Serbian border.
