= Grabovica, Kladovo =

Grabovica Грабовица
- Village
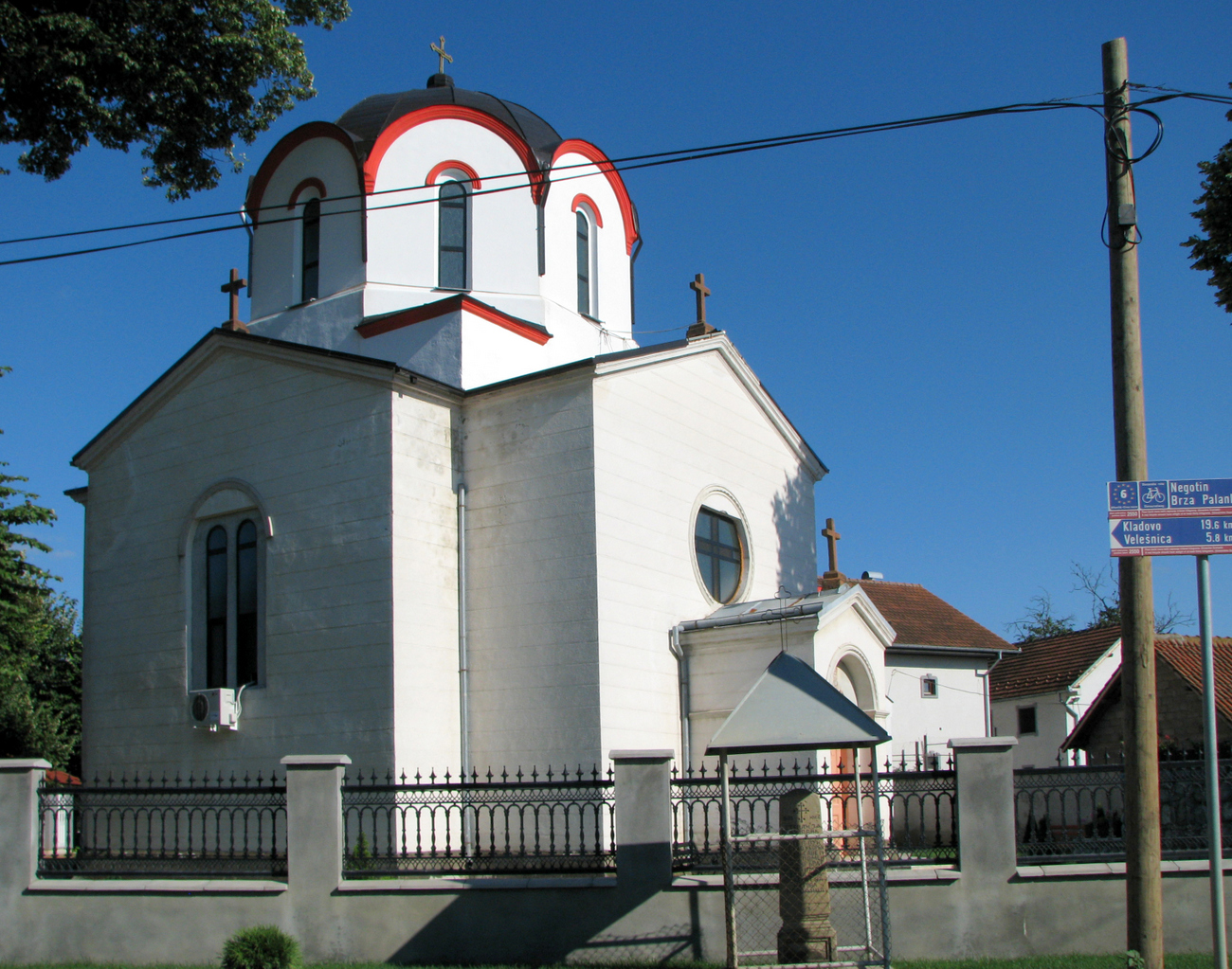
- Church of St Nikola in Grabovica, Serbia

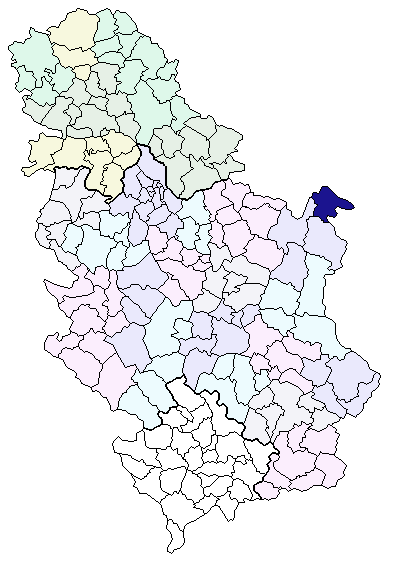
- Location of Kladovo Municipality in Serbia

- Location within Serbia
- Country: Serbia
- District: Bor District
- Municipality: Kladovo

Population (2002)
  - Total: 880
- Time zone: UTC+1 (CET)
  - Summer (DST): UTC+2 (CEST)

Grabovica is a village in the municipality of Kladovo, Serbia. According to the 2002 census, the village has a population of 880 people.
