= Milutinovac =

- Village
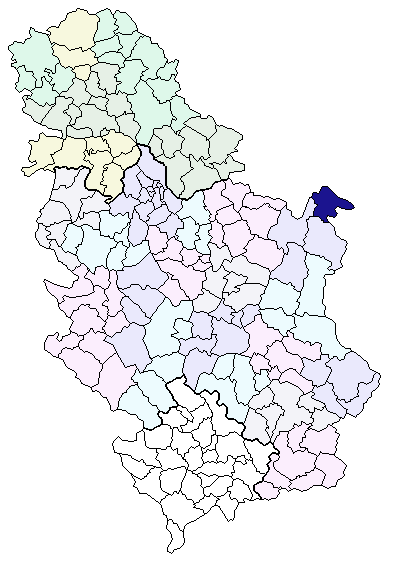
- Location of Kladovo Municipality in Serbia

- Location within Serbia
- Coordinates: 44°33′02″N 22°34′27″E
- Country: Serbia
- District: Bor District
- Municipality: Kladovo

Population (2002)
  - Total: 186
- Time zone: UTC+1 (CET)
  - Summer (DST): UTC+2 (CEST)

Milutinovac is a village in the municipality of Kladovo, Serbia. According to the 2002 census, the village has a population of 186 people.
