= Ljubičevac, Kragujevac =

Ljubičevac Љубичевац (Serbian)
- Village
- Location within Serbia
- Coordinates: 44°07′N 20°36′E
- Country: Serbia
- District: Šumadija District
- City: Kragujevac

Population (2011)
  - Total: 20
- Time zone: UTC+1 (CET)
  - Summer (DST): UTC+2 (CEST)

Ljubičevac (Serbian: Љубичевац) is a village in the city area of Kragujevac, Serbia. According to the 2022 census, the village has a population of 20 people.
