= Kladovo =

Kladovo Кладово (Serbian) Cladova
- Town and municipality
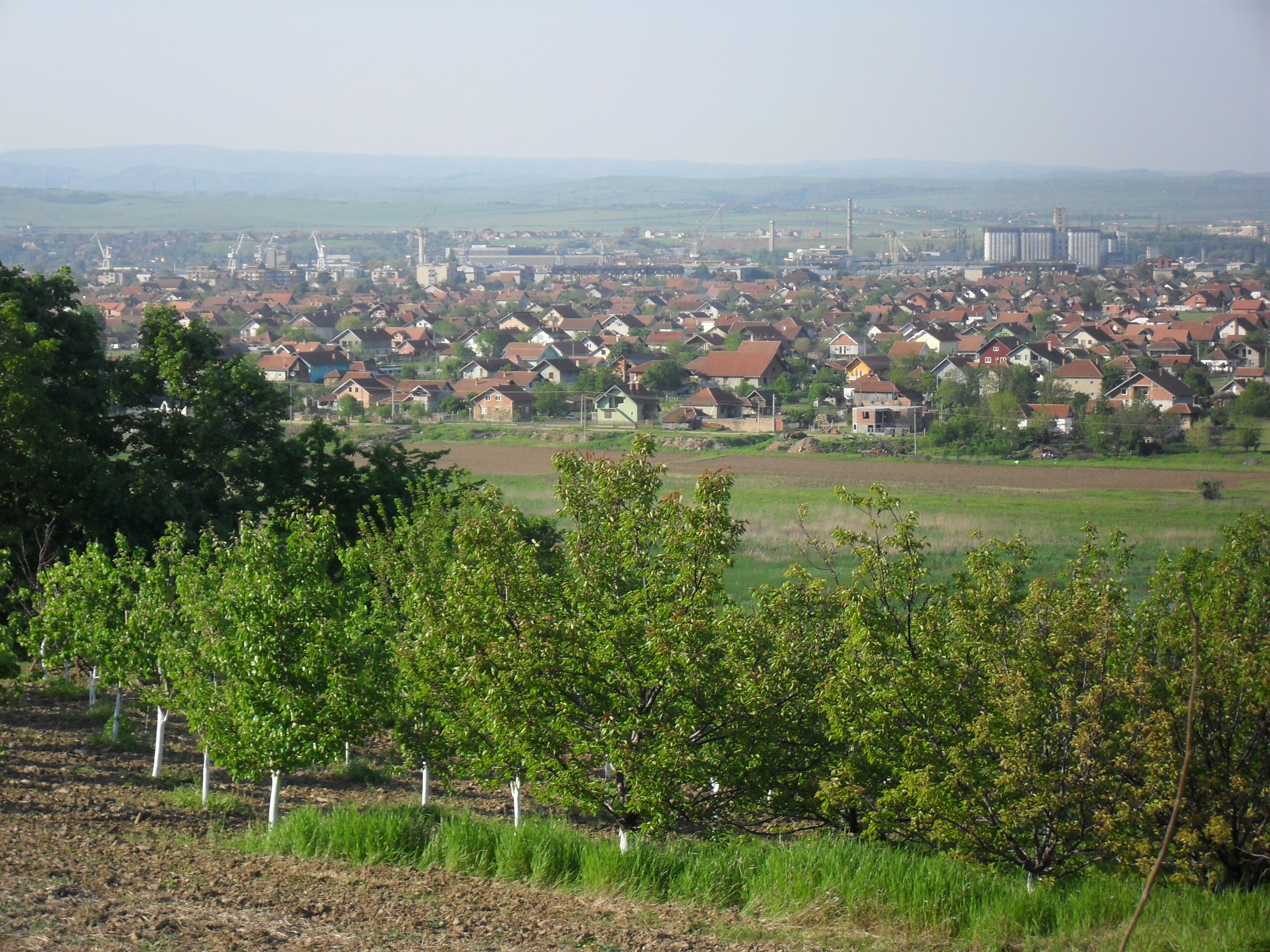
- Kladovo town panorama

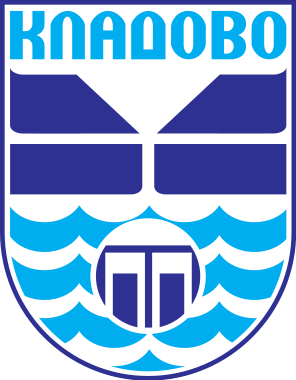
- Coat of arms

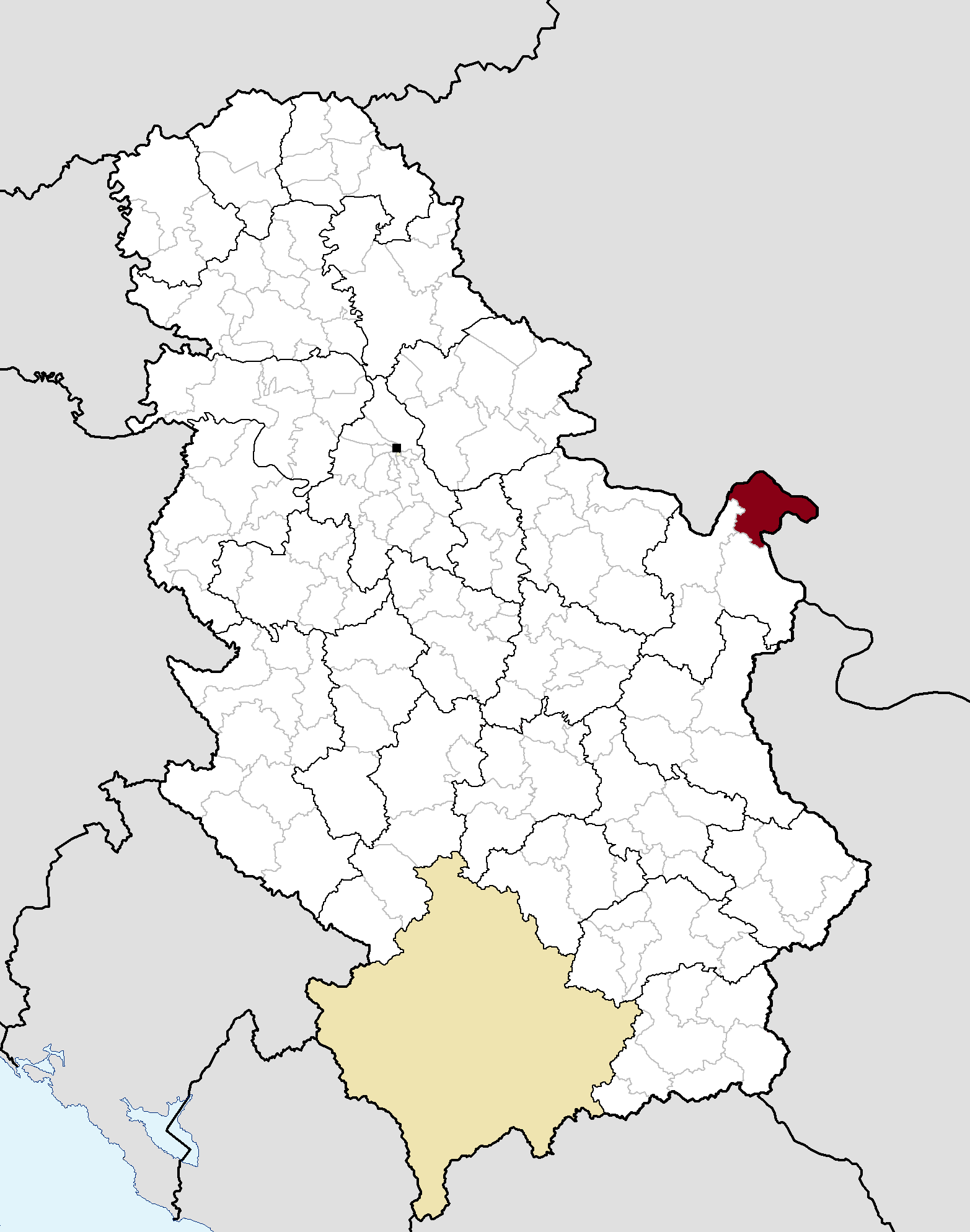
- Location of the municipality of Kladovo within Serbia
- Coordinates: 44°36′24″N 22°36′47″E
- Country: Serbia
- Region: Southern and Eastern Serbia
- District: Bor
- Settlements: 23

Government
  - Mayor: Saša Nikolić (Independent)

Area
  - Town: 29.13 km^{2} (11.25 sq mi)
  - Municipality: 627.25 km^{2} (242.18 sq mi)
- Elevation: 45 m (148 ft)

Population (2022 census)
  - Town: 8,171
  - Town density: 280.5/km^{2} (726.5/sq mi)
  - Municipality: 17,435
  - Municipality density: 27.796/km^{2} (71.991/sq mi)
- Time zone: UTC+1 (CET)
  - Summer (DST): UTC+2 (CEST)
- Postal code: 19320
- Area code: +381(0)19
- Car plates: KL
- Website: www.kladovo.org.rs

Kladovo (Serbian Cyrillic: Кладово, pronounced [klâdɔʋɔ]; Romanian: Cladova or Claudia) is a town and municipality located in the Bor District of eastern Serbia. It is situated on the right bank of the Danube river.

== Name ==
In Serbian, the town is known as Kladovo (Кладово), in Romanian Cladova, in German as Kladowo or Kladovo and in Latin and Romanised Greek as Zanes. In the time of the Roman Empire, the name of the town was Zanes while the Roman forts were known as Diana and Pontes (from Greek "sea" -pontos, or Roman "bridge" - pontem).

Later, Slavs founded a settlement that was named Novi Grad (Нови Град), while Ottomans built a fortress here and called it Fethülislam. The present-day name of Kladovo is first recorded in 1596 in an Austrian military document.

There are several theories about the origin of the current name of the town:

- According to one theory (Ranka Kuic), name of the town derived from Celtic word "kladiff" meaning "cemetery" in English.
- According to another theory (Ranko Jakovljevic), the name derived from the word "klad" (a device used to hold a person shackled).
- A third theory has it that the name derives from the Slavic word "kladenac" meaning "a well" in English or from the Slavic word "klada" meaning "(tree) stump".
- There is also a theory that the name goes back to the Bulgarian duke Glad, who ruled over this region in the 9th century.

There is a settlement with the same name in Russia near Moscow and it is believed that this settlement was founded by Serbs who moved there from Serbian Kladovo in the 18th century. One of the suburbs of Berlin also has this name, which originates from the Slavic Lusatian Serbs (Sorbs) who live in eastern Germany.

The name is also found in the Arad and Timiș counties of Romania, Cladova, in Arad county Cladova, Arad, Cladova in Timiș county Cladova, Timiș

== History ==
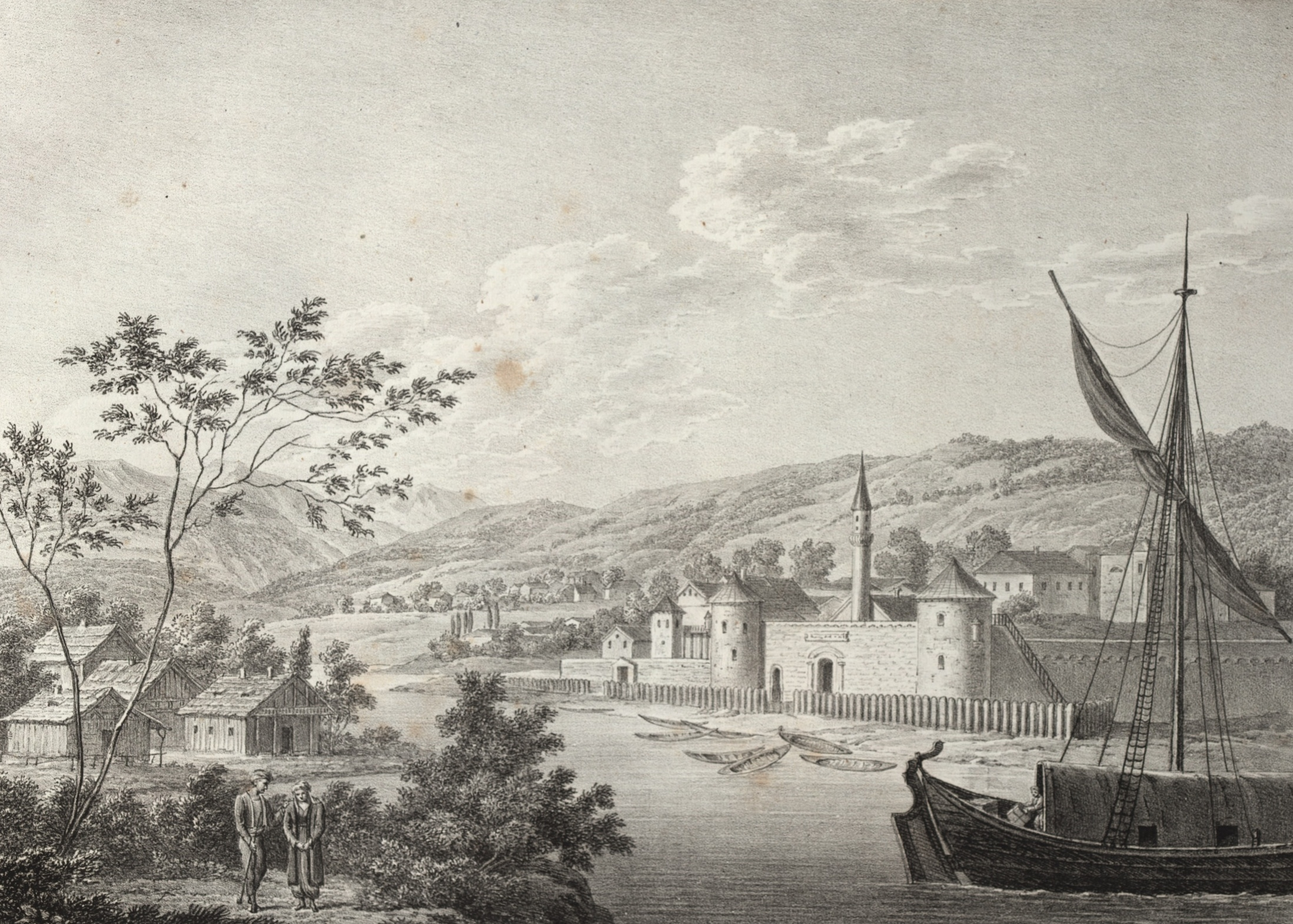
Kladovo in 1826

Early Bronze Age pottery of the Kostolac-Kocofeni culture was found in Donje Butorke, Kladovo, as well as several miniature duck-shaped vases of 14th century BC in Mala Vrbica and Korbovo. Bronze Age necropolis with rituals, pottery (decorated with meander) and other significant archaeological items were found in Korbovo.

Emperor Trajan had the well-known Trajan's Bridge built nearby and the Roman fort of Pontes was built on the Serbian side, Drobeta (castra) on the Romanian side.

In the Middle Ages, Slavs founded here new town named Novi Grad (Нови Град), but it was razed by the Hungarians in 1502. It was rebuilt in 1524 by the Ottomans and received new name: Fethi Islam (Fethülislam). According to Ottoman traveler, Evliya Çelebi, who visited the town in 1666, most of its inhabitants spoke local Slavic language and Turkish language, while some also spoke Romanian. Званични сајт општине Кладово In 1784, the population of Kladovo numbered 140 Muslim and 50 Christian houses. Званични сајт општине Кладово

From 1929 to 1941, Kladovo was part of the Morava Banovina of the Kingdom of Yugoslavia.

== Geography ==
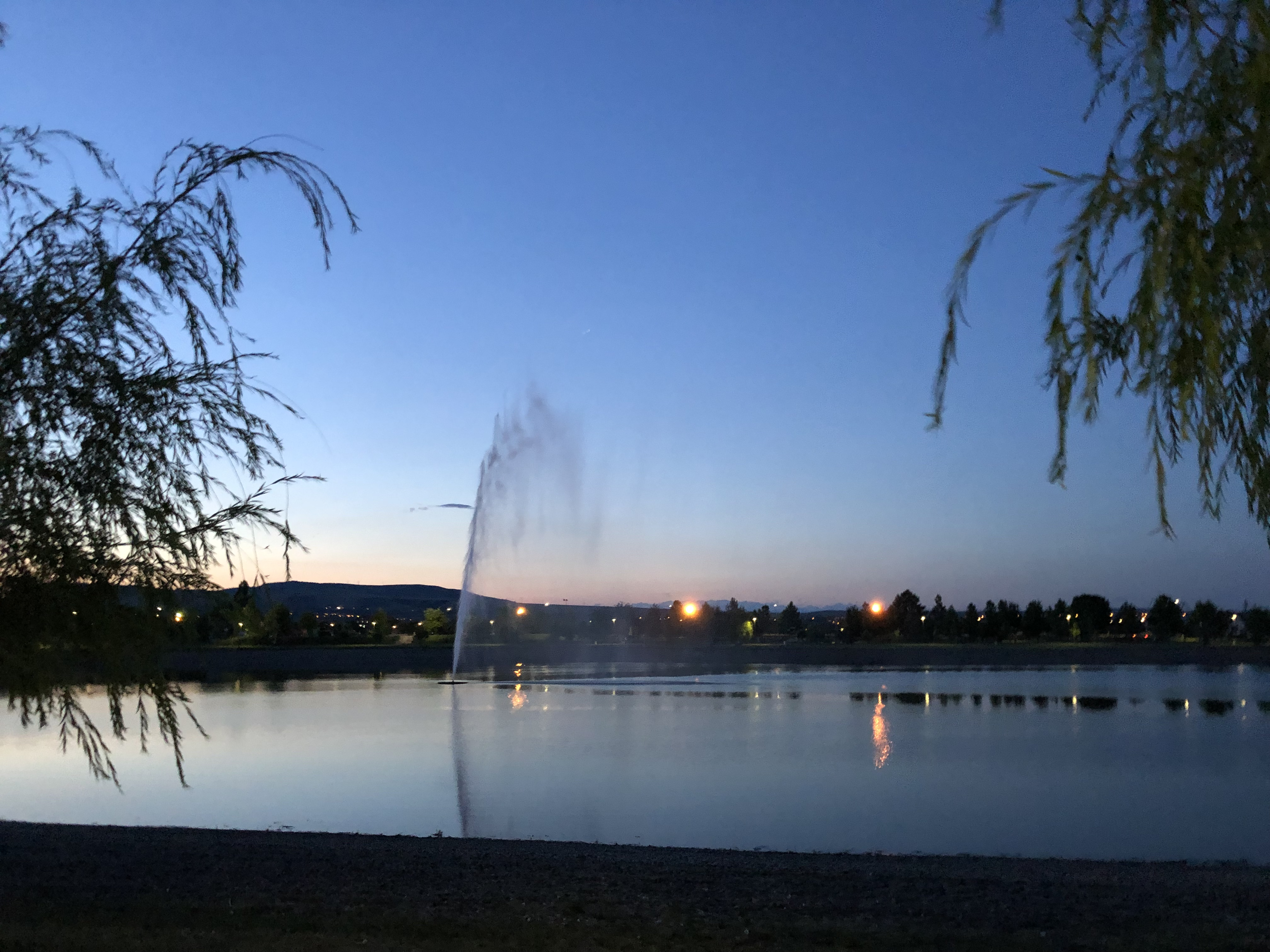
Lake Kladovo

East of the town are the sandy region of Kladovski Peščar, black locust forests, and a marshy area called Kladovski Rit, which used to be a large fish pond. It is home to 140 species of birds, of which 80 nest in the area. There are mixed colonies of pygmy cormorants and herons, while other birds include swans, white-tailed eagles, European bee-eaters, and numerous ducks. The surrounding area is a hunting ground for wild boars. Neighboring geographical localities, such as Osojna and Lolićeva Česma, are popular local excursion areas.

=== Climate ===
Kladovo has a humid subtropical climate (Köppen climate classification: Cfa).

Climate data for Kladovo
| Month | Jan | Feb | Mar | Apr | May | Jun | Jul | Aug | Sep | Oct | Nov | Dec | Year |
|---|---|---|---|---|---|---|---|---|---|---|---|---|---|
| Mean daily maximum °C (°F) | 5 (41) | 6 (43) | 11 (52) | 18 (64) | 23 (73) | 27 (81) | 29 (84) | 30 (86) | 25 (77) | 19 (66) | 12 (54) | 6 (43) | 18 (64) |
| Mean daily minimum °C (°F) | −1 (30) | 0 (32) | 3 (37) | 8 (46) | 13 (55) | 16 (61) | 18 (64) | 19 (66) | 14 (57) | 10 (50) | 5 (41) | 0 (32) | 9 (48) |
| Average precipitation mm (inches) | 57 (2.2) | 61 (2.4) | 55 (2.2) | 68 (2.7) | 74 (2.9) | 71 (2.8) | 55 (2.2) | 44 (1.7) | 48 (1.9) | 55 (2.2) | 72 (2.8) | 71 (2.8) | 731 (28.8) |
Source: Meteoblue.com

Climate data for Grabovica, Kladovo (2016–2025)
| Month | Jan | Feb | Mar | Apr | May | Jun | Jul | Aug | Sep | Oct | Nov | Dec | Year |
|---|---|---|---|---|---|---|---|---|---|---|---|---|---|
| Record high °C (°F) | 20.1 (68.2) | 27.6 (81.7) | 30.8 (87.4) | 38.1 (100.6) | 36.9 (98.4) | 42.5 (108.5) | 43.7 (110.7) | 43.7 (110.7) | 39.4 (102.9) | 31.7 (89.1) | 22.9 (73.2) | 20.4 (68.7) | 43.7 (110.7) |
| Mean maximum °C (°F) | 17.1 (62.8) | 20.2 (68.4) | 26.4 (79.5) | 30.2 (86.4) | 33.4 (92.1) | 38.2 (100.8) | 39.9 (103.8) | 41.0 (105.8) | 35.6 (96.1) | 28.5 (83.3) | 20.9 (69.6) | 17.3 (63.1) | 41.6 (106.9) |
| Mean daily maximum °C (°F) | 7.4 (45.3) | 11.0 (51.8) | 15.5 (59.9) | 20.8 (69.4) | 25.2 (77.4) | 31.5 (88.7) | 34.4 (93.9) | 34.8 (94.6) | 28.5 (83.3) | 20.9 (69.6) | 12.0 (53.6) | 8.7 (47.7) | 20.9 (69.6) |
| Daily mean °C (°F) | 2.7 (36.9) | 5.7 (42.3) | 9.3 (48.7) | 14.0 (57.2) | 18.7 (65.7) | 24.4 (75.9) | 26.6 (79.9) | 26.8 (80.2) | 21.3 (70.3) | 15.0 (59.0) | 8.0 (46.4) | 4.7 (40.5) | 14.8 (58.6) |
| Mean daily minimum °C (°F) | −2.0 (28.4) | 0.3 (32.5) | 3.0 (37.4) | 7.1 (44.8) | 12.1 (53.8) | 17.3 (63.1) | 18.9 (66.0) | 18.9 (66.0) | 14.2 (57.6) | 9.2 (48.6) | 4.1 (39.4) | 0.7 (33.3) | 8.7 (47.6) |
| Mean minimum °C (°F) | −8.3 (17.1) | −7.0 (19.4) | −3.4 (25.9) | 1.0 (33.8) | 7.3 (45.1) | 12.2 (54.0) | 14.1 (57.4) | 14.4 (57.9) | 7.9 (46.2) | 4.4 (39.9) | −2.9 (26.8) | −4.8 (23.4) | −9.8 (14.4) |
| Record low °C (°F) | −15.8 (3.6) | −9.1 (15.6) | −9.5 (14.9) | −2.4 (27.7) | 4.6 (40.3) | 8.1 (46.6) | 12.2 (54.0) | 10.4 (50.7) | 3.0 (37.4) | −0.4 (31.3) | −5.3 (22.5) | −8.1 (17.4) | −15.8 (3.6) |
| Average precipitation mm (inches) | 60.1 (2.37) | 31.2 (1.23) | 51.1 (2.01) | 53.7 (2.11) | 70.0 (2.76) | 49.5 (1.95) | 44.5 (1.75) | 21.1 (0.83) | 32.1 (1.26) | 34.7 (1.37) | 68.2 (2.69) | 57.4 (2.26) | 573.6 (22.59) |
Source: vreme.in.rs

== Settlements ==
Aside from the town of Kladovo, the municipality includes the following settlements:

Towns

- Kladovo
- Brza Palanka

Villages

- Vajuga
- Velesnica
- Velika Vrbica
- Velika Kamenica
- Grabovica
- Davidovac
- Kladušnica
- Korbovo
- Kostol
- Kupuzište
- Ljubičevac
- Mala Vrbica
- Manastirica
- Milutinovac
- Novi Sip
- Petrovo Selo
- Podvrška
- Reka
- Rečica
- Rtkovo
- Tekija na Dunavu

== Demographics ==
Historical population
| Year | Pop. | ±% p.a. |
|---|---|---|
| 1948 | 26,161 | — |
| 1953 | 27,792 | +1.22% |
| 1961 | 28,217 | +0.19% |
| 1971 | 33,173 | +1.63% |
| 1981 | 33,376 | +0.06% |
| 1991 | 31,881 | −0.46% |
| 2002 | 23,613 | −2.69% |
| 2011 | 20,635 | −1.49% |

According to the 2011 census results, the municipality has a population of 20,635 inhabitants.

=== Ethnic groups ===
The ethnic composition of the municipality:

| Ethnic group | Population | % |
|---|---|---|
| Serbs | 17,673 | 85.65% |
| Vlachs | 788 | 3.82% |
| Montenegrins | 236 | 1.14% |
| Romanians (self-declared) | 156 | 0.76% |
| Macedonians | 42 | 0.20% |
| Romani | 36 | 0.17% |
| Croats | 35 | 0.17% |
| Yugoslavs | 16 | 0.08% |
| Others | 1,653 | 8.01% |
| Total | 20,635 | |

In 2014, a Romanian online daily newspaper, Jurnal Românesc, financed by the Department for Romanians Everywhere (DRP), opened an editorial office in Kladovo. Its director, Romeo Crîșmaru, a journalist from Drobeta-Turnu Severin, stated the idea to open an office in the town came due to the great lack of Romanian-speaking journalists in the region, adding that many people in the area speak Romanian but cannot write or read it. Furthermore, on 3 December that year, a Romanian Cultural Center was inaugurated in Kladovo, in a project financed by the DRP.

== Economy ==
The main business are the hydro-electric power plants of Đerdap: Iron Gate I and Iron Gate II; both operated by Elektroprivreda Srbije (EPS). Other businesses began primarily to support the building and operation of the power plant, and the local folk.

The population of the villages around Kladovo is mostly supported by the family members who work in the countries of western Europe, agriculture is a side activity more than an income-generating one.

The following table gives a preview of total number of registered people employed in legal entities per their core activity (as of 2024):

| Activity | Total |
|---|---|
| Agriculture, forestry and fishing | 62 |
| Mining and quarrying | 3 |
| Manufacturing | 1,400 |
| Electricity, gas, steam and air conditioning supply | 388 |
| Water supply; sewerage, waste management and remediation activities | 97 |
| Construction | 139 |
| Wholesale and retail trade, repair of motor vehicles and motorcycles | 783 |
| Transportation and storage | 102 |
| Accommodation and food services | 292 |
| Information and communication | 72 |
| Financial and insurance activities | 37 |
| Real estate activities | - |
| Professional, scientific and technical activities | 122 |
| Administrative and support service activities | 207 |
| Public administration and defense; compulsory social security | 315 |
| Education | 269 |
| Human health and social work activities | 494 |
| Arts, entertainment and recreation | 31 |
| Other service activities | 78 |
| Individual agricultural workers | 64 |
| Total | 4,955 |

== Features ==
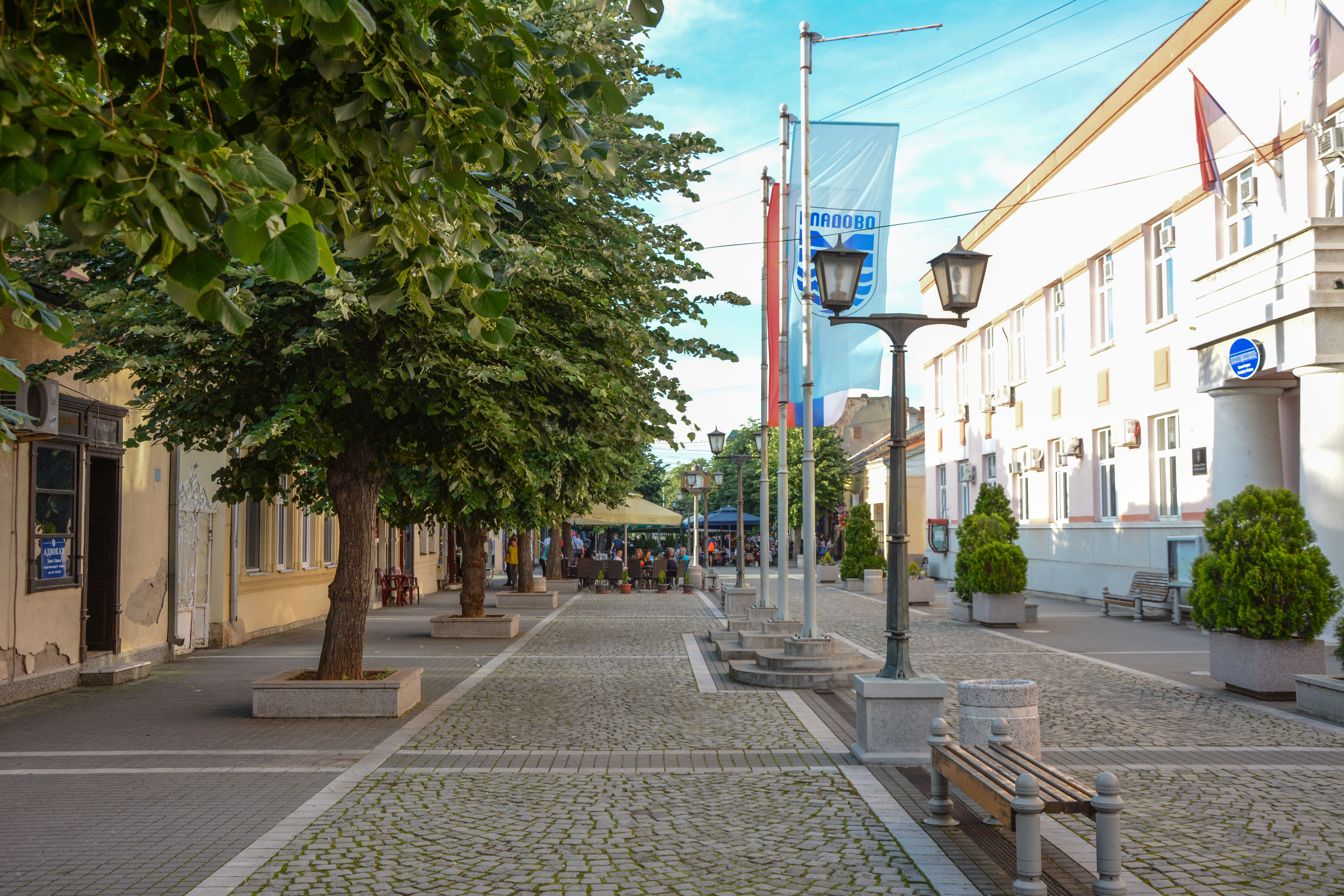
Pedestrian zone

Kladovo has one hospital, two daycare and kindergarten centers, one elementary school (grades 1 through 8), one high school and several vocational schools.

Though the river Danube is very polluted by international standards, many people still fish in it. Before the power plant was built, sturgeon caviar from this area was very popular and was exported as a delicacy to the western Europe and the United States. In the 1960s, up to 3 tons of caviar yearly was exported from Kladovo. Record catch from that period is a 188 kg (414 lb) heavy sturgeon with 20 kg (44 lb) of the roe in it. However, the records from the past, dated in 1793, report of the sturgeon which had 500 kg (1,100 lb). The specificity of the Caviar of Kladovo was that the roe gets "ripe" enough during the 850 km (530 mi) long journey of the fish from the Black Sea upstream the Danube. Also, roe was turned into the caviar using the dry method.

The nearby archeological sites include the remnants of Roman Emperor Trajan's Bridge, a Trajan table, remnants of Trajan's road through the Danube's Iron Gates, and the Roman fortress Diana.

The Trajan's Bridge is located 5 km downstream from Kladovo. It had 20 pillars and was 1,200 m long. Trajan's successor Hadrian partially demolished it to prevent the raids of the Dacians and the bridge was later neglected. The bridge is depicted in a relief on the Trajan's Column in Rome. Until the 16th century, it was the largest bridge ever built. The 20 pillars were still visible in 1856, when the level of the Danube hit a record low. In 1906, the Commission of the Danube decided to destroy two of the pillars that were obstructing navigation. In 1932, there were 16 pillars remaining underwater, but in 1982 only 12 were mapped by archaeologists; the other four had probably been swept away by water. Only the entrance pillars are now visible on either bank of the Danube.

When the artificial Đerdap Lake was formed from 1967-72 as a result of the Iron Gate I Hydroelectric Power Station. The lake inundated the old Roman road along the coast and the only remaining part of the old path is the Tabula Traiana, a Roman memorial plaque, which was elevated for 25 m. The process of lifting the table (4 m x 1.75 m) lasted from 1966 to 1969, today is several meters above the lake level and is observable only from the lake.

Remains of the fortress Diana are located 2 km downstream of the Iron Gate I. Diana is one of the largest and best preserved Roman forts on this section of the Danubian Limes. It was built by the emperor Trajan at the beginning of the 2nd century BC and was destroyed by the joint attack of the Slavs and Pannonian Avars in the 6th century.

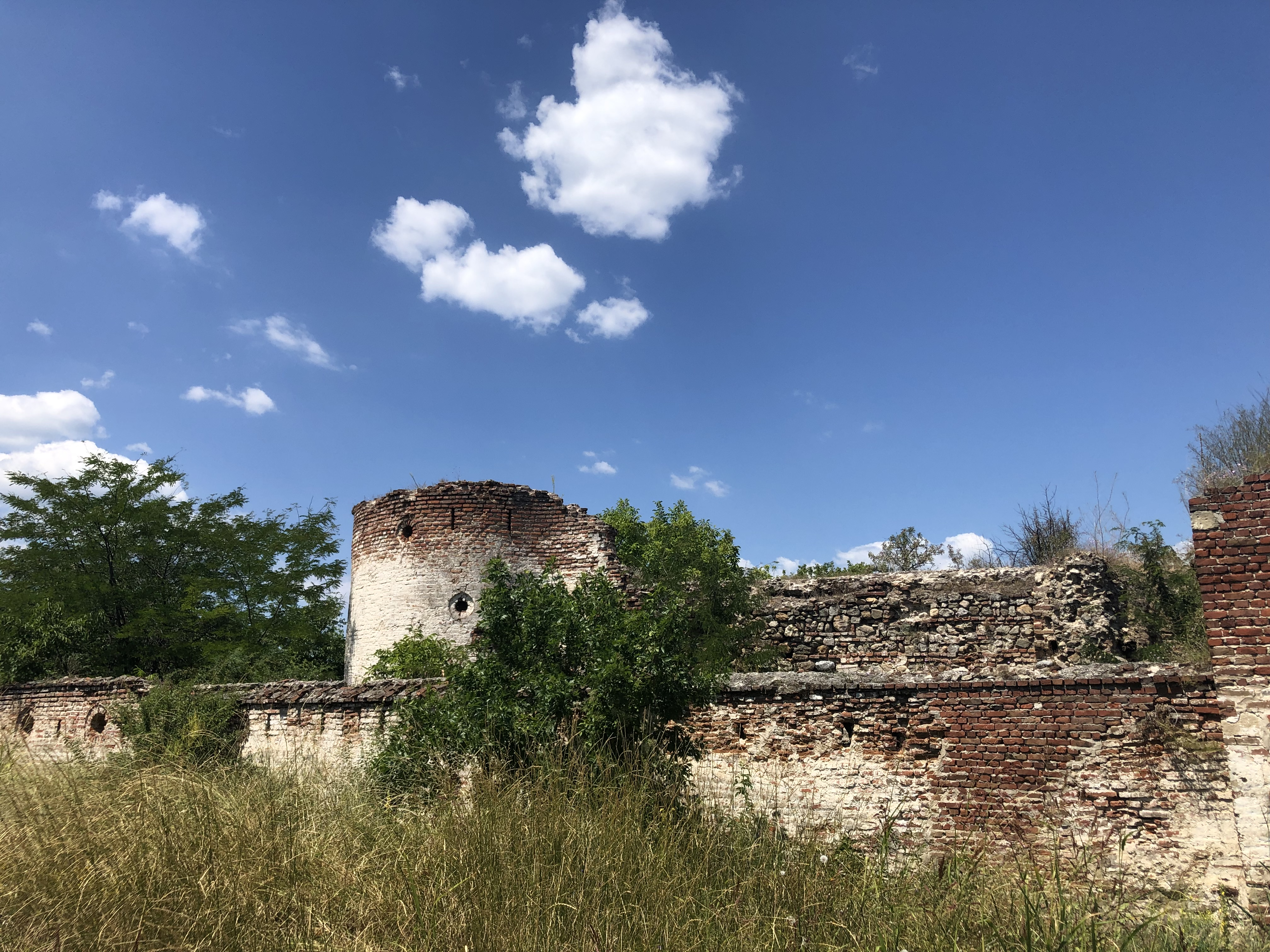
Fetislam fortress

During the Ottoman occupation of the Balkan peninsula a fortress was built near the town. It was named Fetislam (originally Feht-ul-Islam meaning "gate of Islam") and it is located 300 m (980 ft) upstream of Kladovo's downtown. Construction began in 1524 and the present look of Fetislam dates from the period of Suleiman the Magnificent in the mid 16th century. The construction was supervised by Malkoçoğlu Bali Bey, while the architect was Osman Pasha. It consists of "Big Town" and "Little Town", which represent two levels of the fortress' defense. It was very important for the Ottomans as, due to its location, domineered the Iron Gate gorge. Fetislam has round, two-storeys high towers. The rectangular cannon fortification with six round bastions, Fetislam became important military structure up to the end of World War I. It was damaged in World War II and by the neglect after the war. In 1968 conversion into the sport complex slowly began and it was partially renovated in 1973, including the amphitheater. The fortress was endangered with the rise of the Danube water level with the construction of the massive Iron Gate dam. Today, it contains children's playgrounds, track and soccer fields, handball, volleyball and tennis courts.

The Đerdap national park offers scenic views, excellent hunting grounds, and many trails for hiking (most trails are not well marked or maintained, so hiking is recommended only for the experienced).

The town has two hotels: "Đerdap" and "Aquastar Danube". Nearby the city (8 km on the road to Belgrade) there is a youth camp named "Karataš" (Turkish kara-tash for "black stone") which can host some of the visiting tourists. Kladovo has many cafés and restaurants, some offering live music entertainment late into the night. The town's quay stretches about 3 kilometers (1.9 mi) along the Danube river and is used for walking and cycling.

Kladovo has a beach, Đerdap Archaeology Museum, Orthodox Church of Saint George and a pedestrian zone (Kladovo Skadarlija). Kladovo is on the European bicycle path and in 2016 about 16,000 cyclists passed through the town. As of 2017, the bus line Belgrade-Kladovo was the only one in Serbia which had bicycle carriers on the buses. The neighboring villages of Tekija and Brza Palanka also arranged beaches on the river. Other touristic attractions include the organized visits to the Iron Gate I power plant, local cuisine and the surrounding wine region between Kladovo and Negotin, the Negotin Valley. In the 19th century, the wine produced here was shipped to Belgrade, Novi Sad, Budapest, Vienna, etc.

The public market was open in 1586, when the Ottomans moved the seat of nahiyah to Fetislam tower. In the mid-19th century, it was recorded that the market is open on Saturdays. In the mid-20th century, the market was equipped with the concrete market stalls, receiving little maintenance until 2019, when more extensive renovation works begun.

== Gallery ==
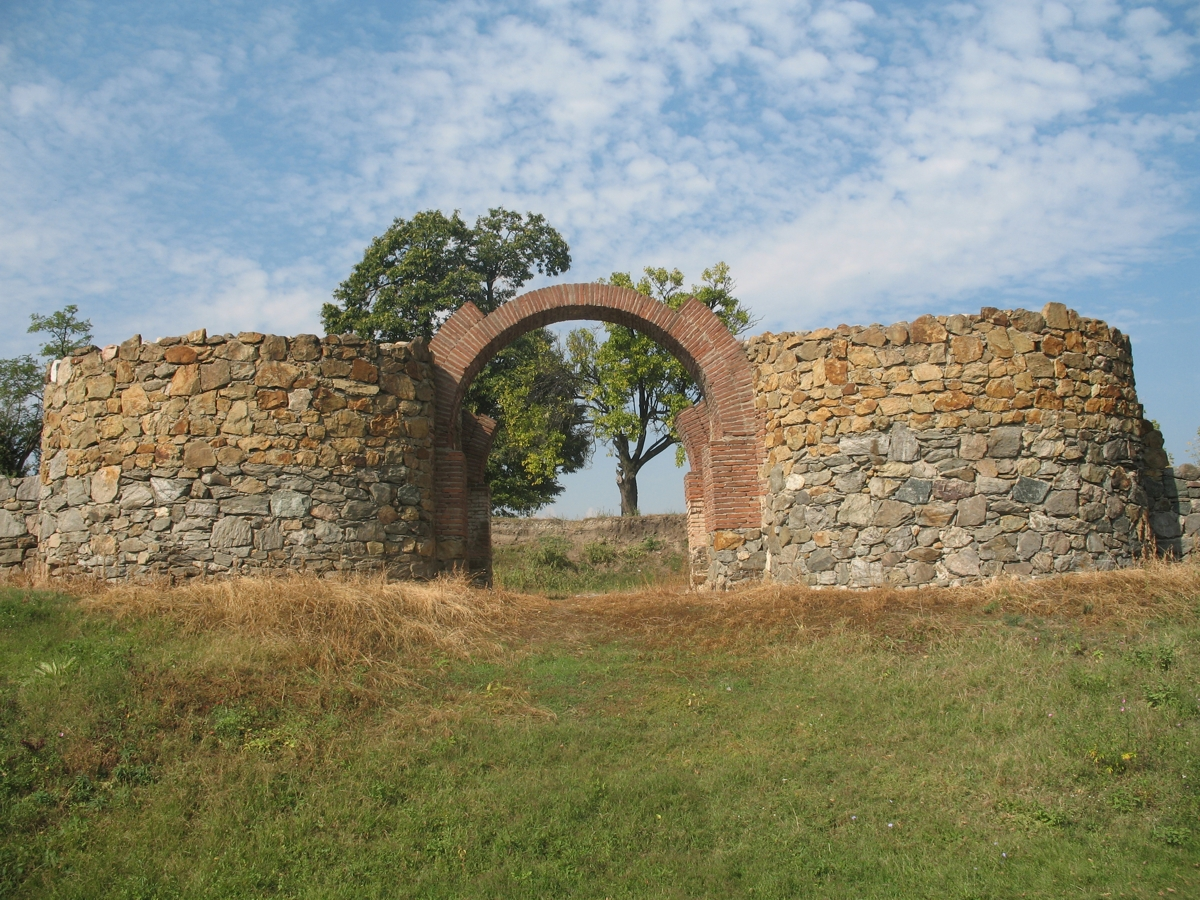
Diana Fortress

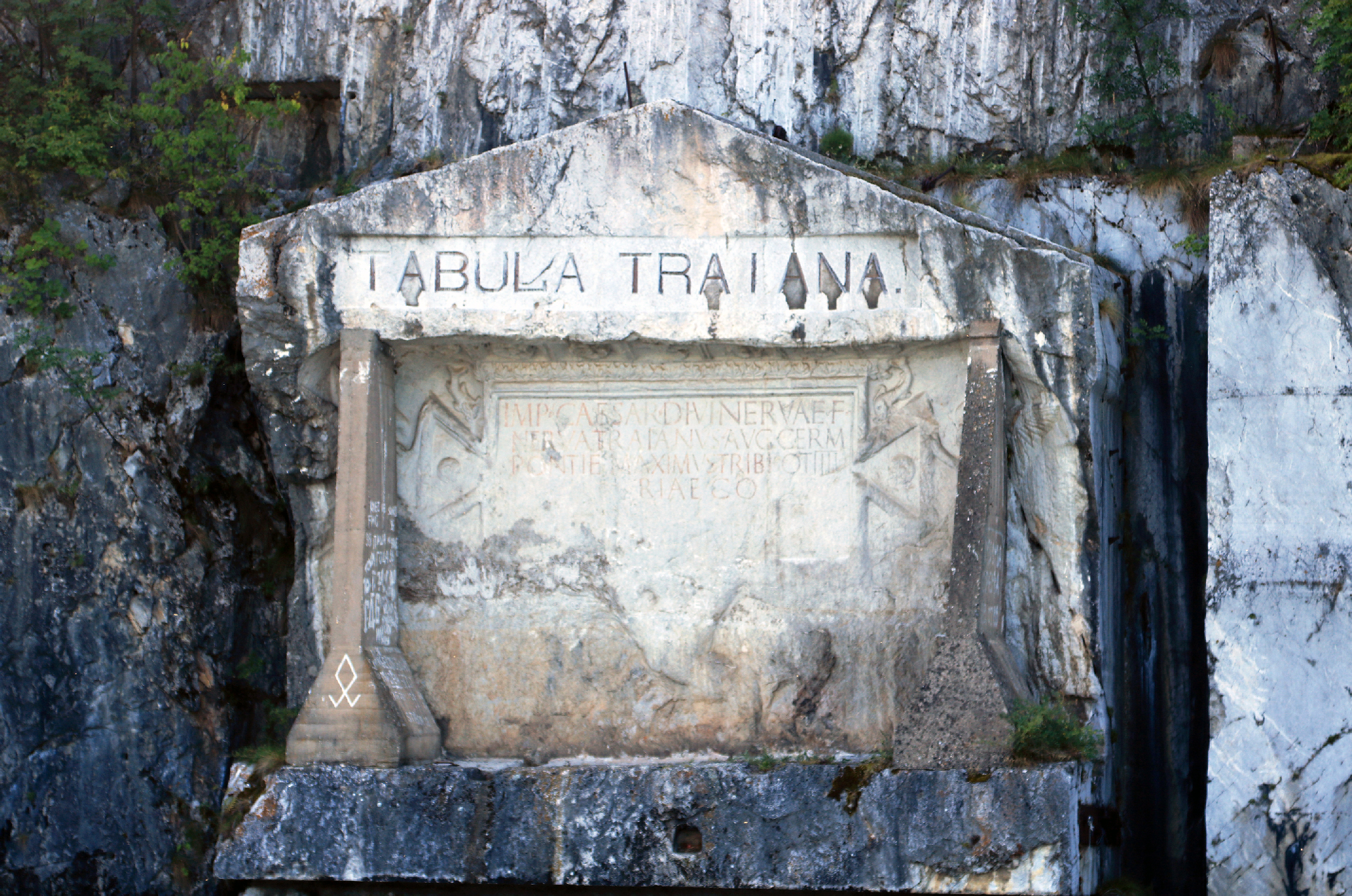
Tabula Traiana

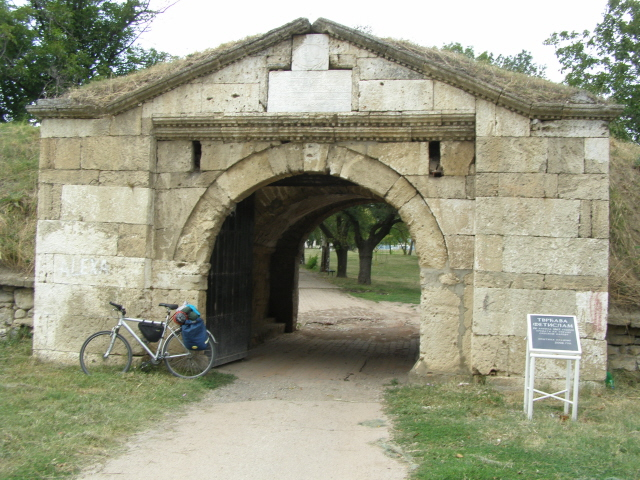
Fetislam Fortress entry

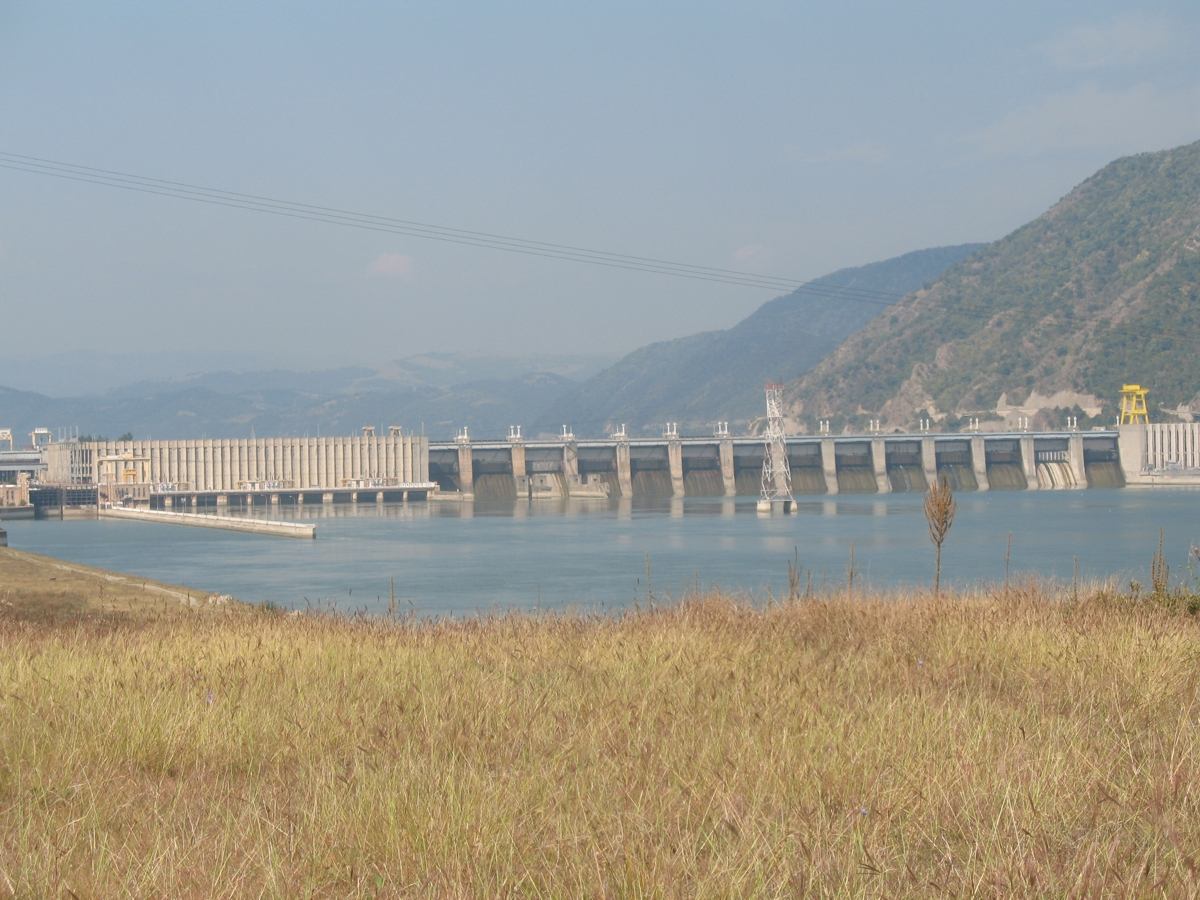
Iron Gate I Hydroelectric Power Station

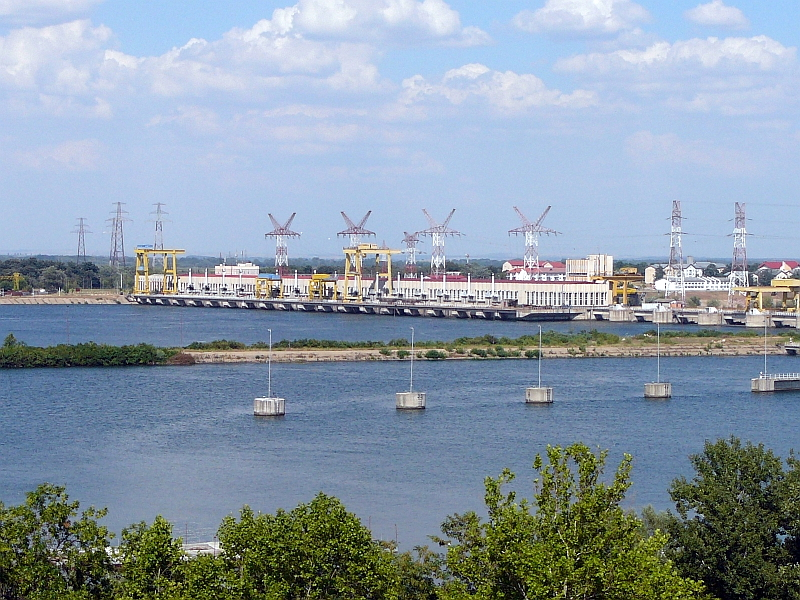
Iron Gate II Hydroelectric Power Station

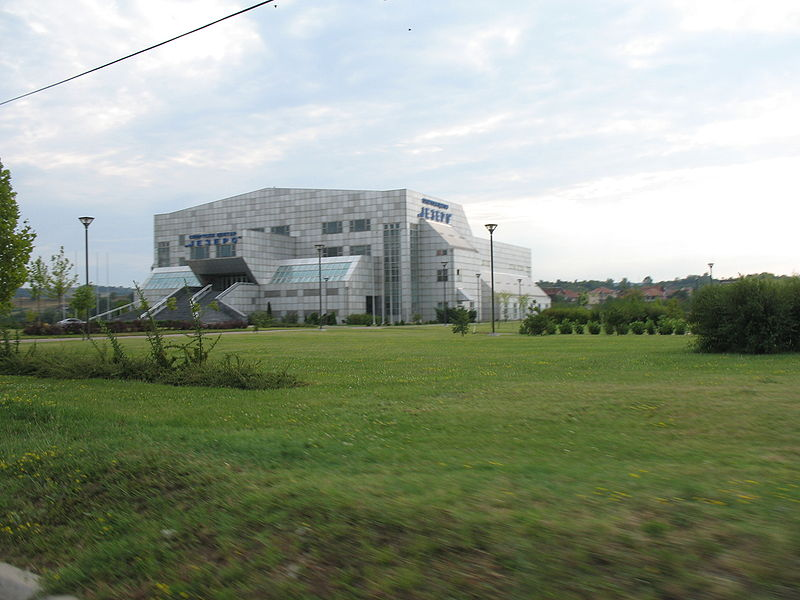
Sports Hall "Jezero"

== Notable residents ==
Born in Kladovo municipality:

- Avram Petronijević, born in Tekija (Kladovo)
- Darko Perić, actor, born in Kladovo

Temporary residents:

- Nicodemus of Tismana (14-15th century)
- Vuk Stefanović Karadžić, a Serbian linguist and reformer of the Serbian language

== See also ==
- Kladovo transport
