= Rtkovo =

- Village
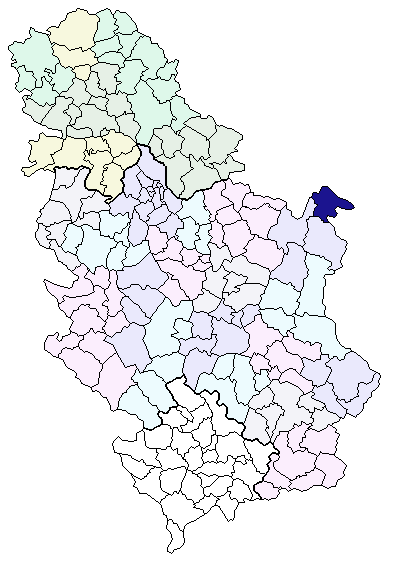
- Location of Kladovo Municipality in Serbia

- Location within Serbia
- Country: Serbia
- District: Bor District
- Municipality: Kladovo

Population (2002)
  - Total: 1,012
- Time zone: UTC+1 (CET)
  - Summer (DST): UTC+2 (CEST)

Rtkovo is a village in the municipality of Kladovo, Serbia. According to the 2002 census, the village has a population of 1012 people.
