= Serbian Carpathians =

Mountain range in Central Serbia

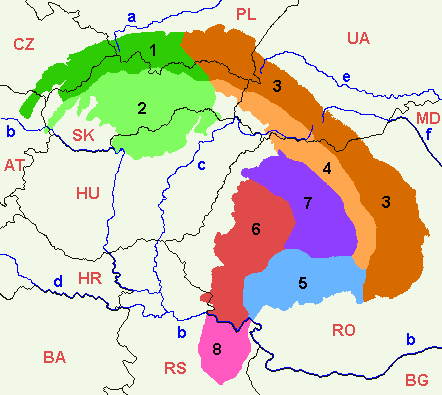
Map of the Carpathian Mountains (Serbian Carpathians in pink, nr 8)

Serbian Carpathians (Serbian: Српски Карпати / Srpski Karpati) is a mountain range in eastern Serbia, located in Central Europe. It presents an extension of proper Carpathian Mountains across the Danube, connecting them with the Balkan Mountains in the southeast. They stretch in north–south direction in eastern Serbia, east of the Great Morava valley and west of the White Timok Valley and north of the Nišava Valley. The mountains are 800–1500 m high, and dominated by karst limestone geologic features, the highest one being Rtanj Mountain (1,565 m).

== Definitions ==
Under the strict definition (as defined by the Serbian Academy of Sciences and Arts and adopted by the Carpathian Convention), Serbian part of the Carpathian Mountains covers only 732 km^{2}, or less than 1% of the total Carpathian area. That part encompasses the southern bank of the Iron Gate and the area of Đerdap National Park. The extreme points of so defined Carpathian area in Serbia are Tekija 44°43′N 22°28′E in the north, 44°22′N 22°06′E in the south, Golubac 44°40′N 21°36′E in the west and 44°39′N 22°33′E in the east (Iron Gate dam). It covers northern rims of northern Kučaj, Šomrda, Liskovac, Veliki Greben and Miroč mountains, in municipalities of Golubac, Majdanpek and Kladovo

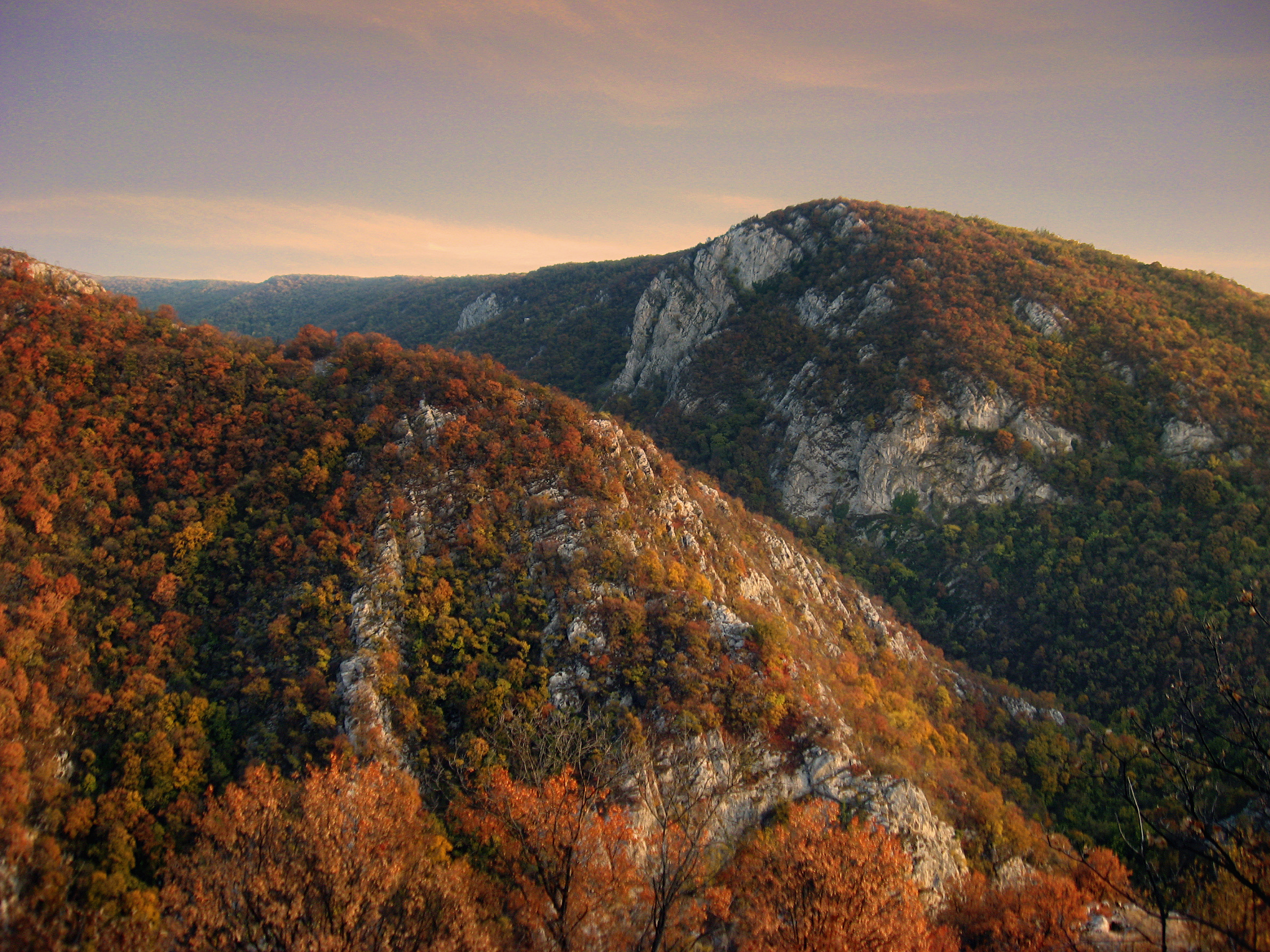
Kučaj Mountains

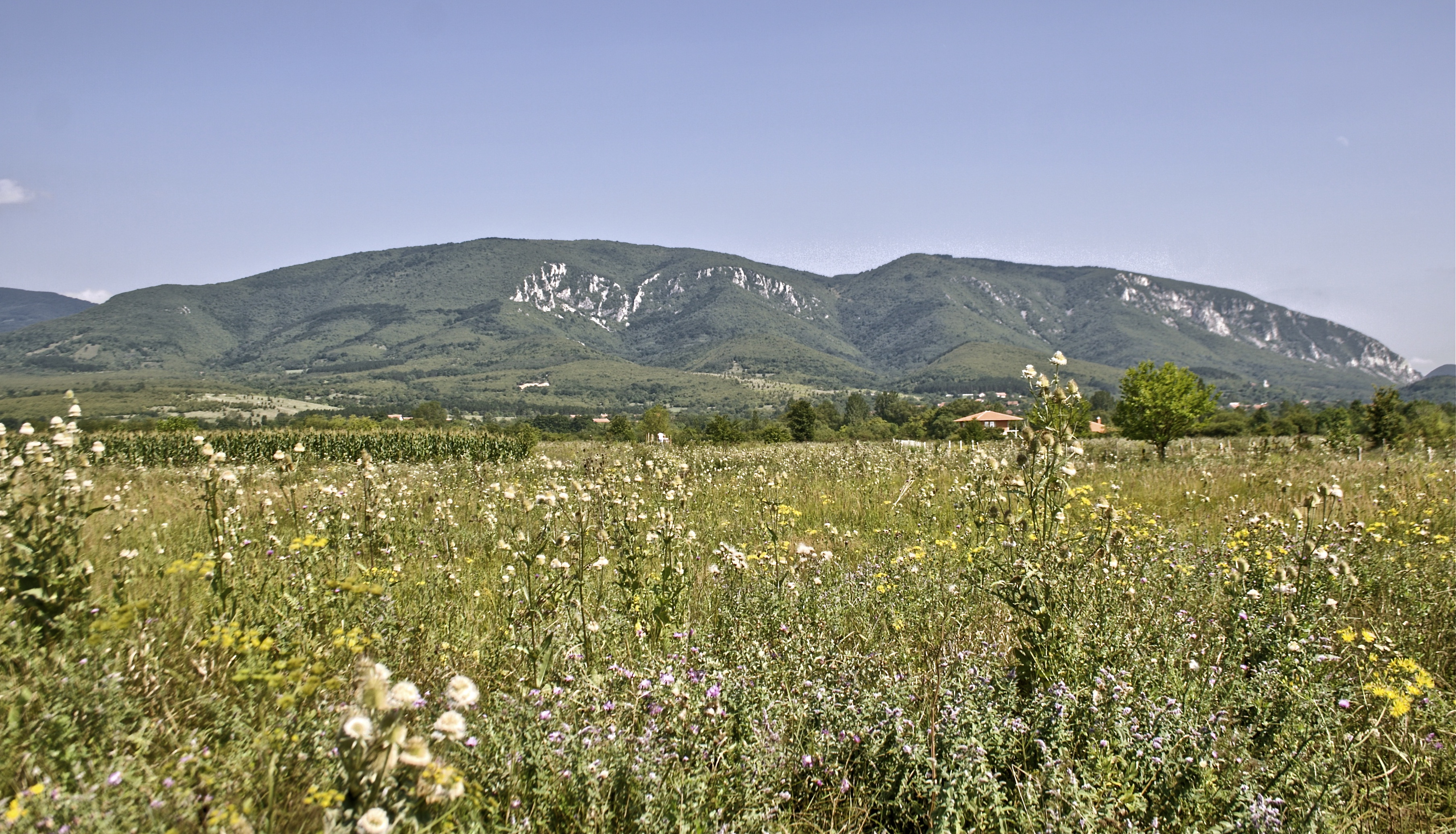
Homolje Mountains

However, in Serbian geography, the epithet "Carpathian" is traditionally also given to the whole northern part of the Carpatho-Balkan arc, which connects the Carpathians proper with the Balkan Mountains. It refers to the following mountains:

- Šomrda
- Liškovac
- Veliki Greben
- Miroč
- Homolje Mountains
- Veliki Krš
- Mali Krš
- Stol
- Deli Jovan
- Beljanica
- Kučaj Mountains
- Rtanj
- Tupižnica
- Devica
- Ozren

There are incentives to incorporate the whole wider Serbian Carpathian region into the framework of the Carpathian Convention. Serbia ratified the Convention in November 2007.

== Geology ==
The entire part of Serbia east of the Great and South Morava rivers is referred to as "Carpatho-Balkan arc" in geotectonic terminology. The region is composed of rocks of Proterozoic to Quaternary age. Limestones and dolomites (in a lesser extent) of Jurassic (J2, J3) and Lower Cretaceous (K1+2, K3+4) age whose thickness can be more than 1,000 m. The structures are generally oriented in north–south direction, which bend on northern and southern parts, forming a C-shaped arc.

Though those mountains are related to the Carpathians from the geological point of view, they have been included to them by the scientists only at the end of the 20th century. In the past, those mountains were included by mistake to the Balkan Mountains.

== Demographics ==
Eastern Serbia is one of the most sparsely populated areas of the Balkans. A large portion of the population is engaged in nomadic sheep-breeding. The population is mixed of Serbs and Romanians. It is underdeveloped, with sparse infrastructure and long distances between towns. The region is subject to further depopulation: between censuses of 1991 and 2002, municipalities of Bor and Majdanpek lost 3,500 residents each, Negotin lost 5,500, Zaječar lost 5,000, and Knjaževac 6,500.

== See also ==
- List of mountains in Serbia
