= Đerdap National Park =

National park in Serbia

Coordinates: 44°26′N 22°06′E

- IUCN category II (national park)
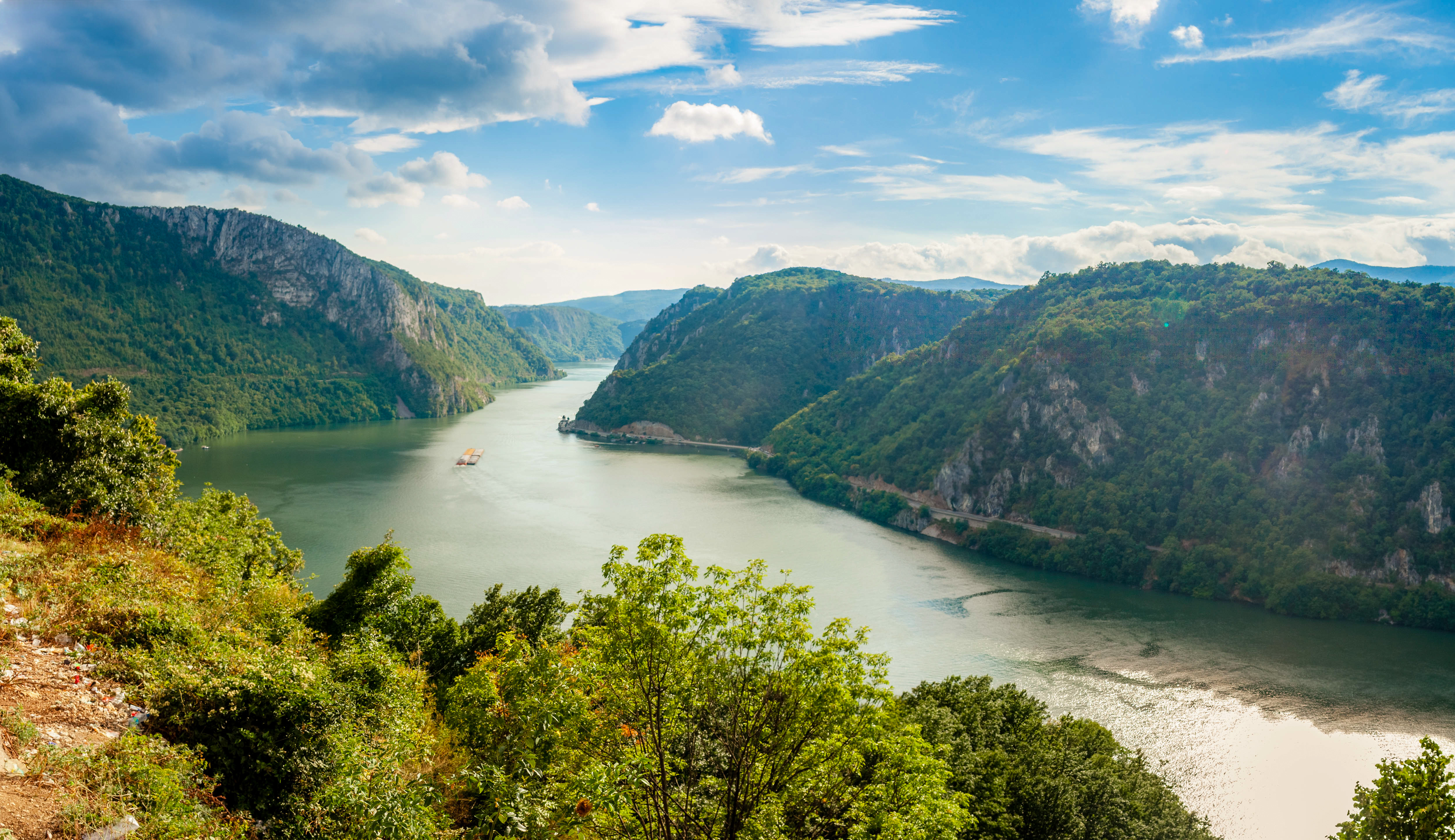
- Đerdap National Park
- Interactive map of Đerdap National Park
- Area: 637.87 km^{2} (246.28 sq mi)
- Established: 1974
- Website: Djerdap

Ramsar Wetland
- Official name: Djerdap
- Designated: 8 June 2020
- Reference no.: 2442

Đerdap National Park (Serbian: Национални парк Ђердап / Nacionalni park Đerdap) stretches along the right bank of the Danube River from the Golubac Fortress (Serbian: Голубачки град / Golubački grad) to the dam near Novi Sip, Serbia. It was established in 1974 and spreads on 63,786.5 ha (157,620 acres). The park management office is in the town of Donji Milanovac on the Danube. Across the river is the Parcul Natural Porțile de Fier in Romania.

In July 2020 the wider area of the national park was designated as the UNESCO global geopark, as the first protected area from Serbia labeled that way. Apart from the Iron Gates Gorge, the geopark includes parts of the Miroč and Kučaj mountain massifs, with total area of 1,330 km^{2} (510 sq mi).

== Geography ==
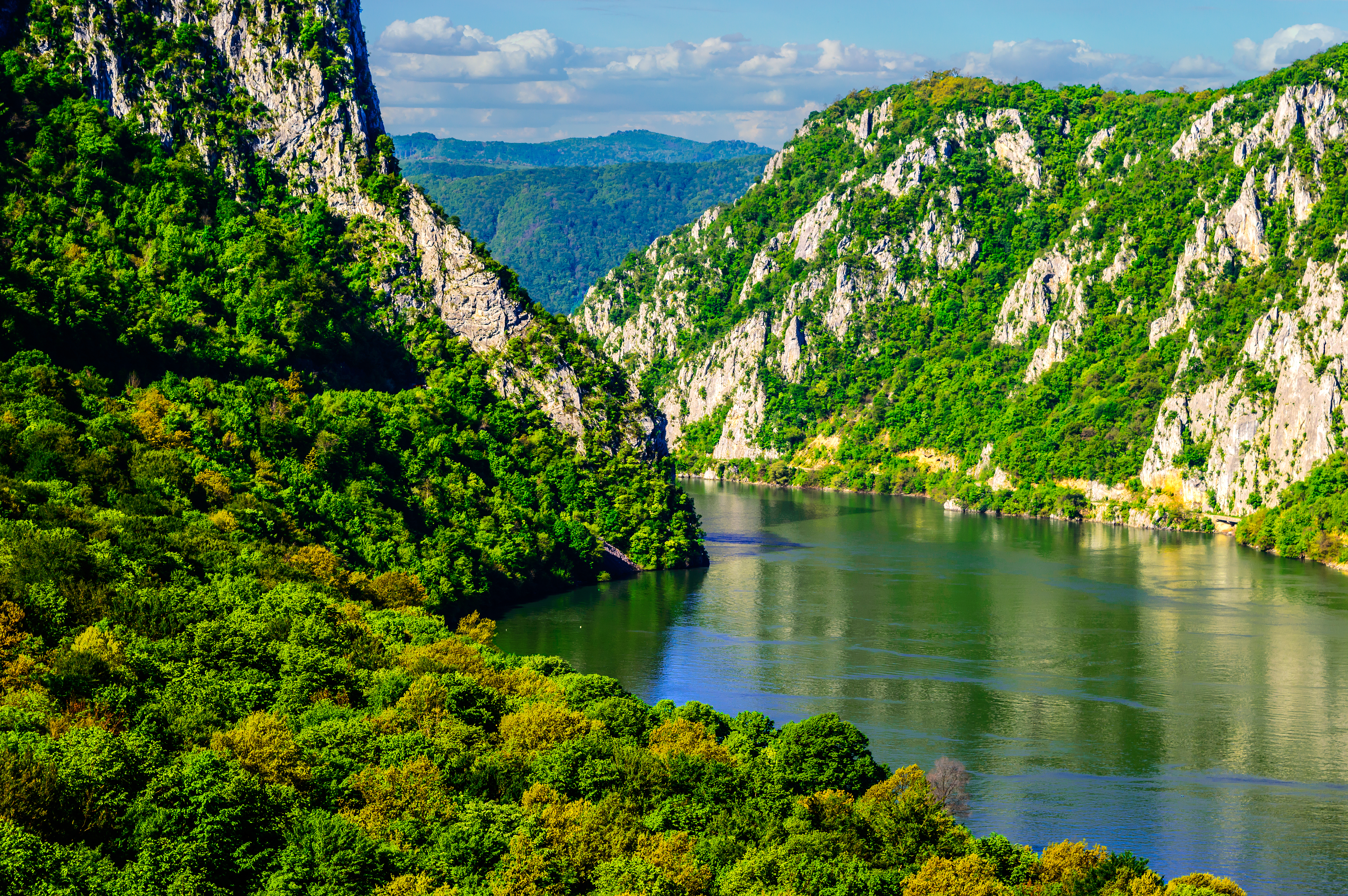
The national park

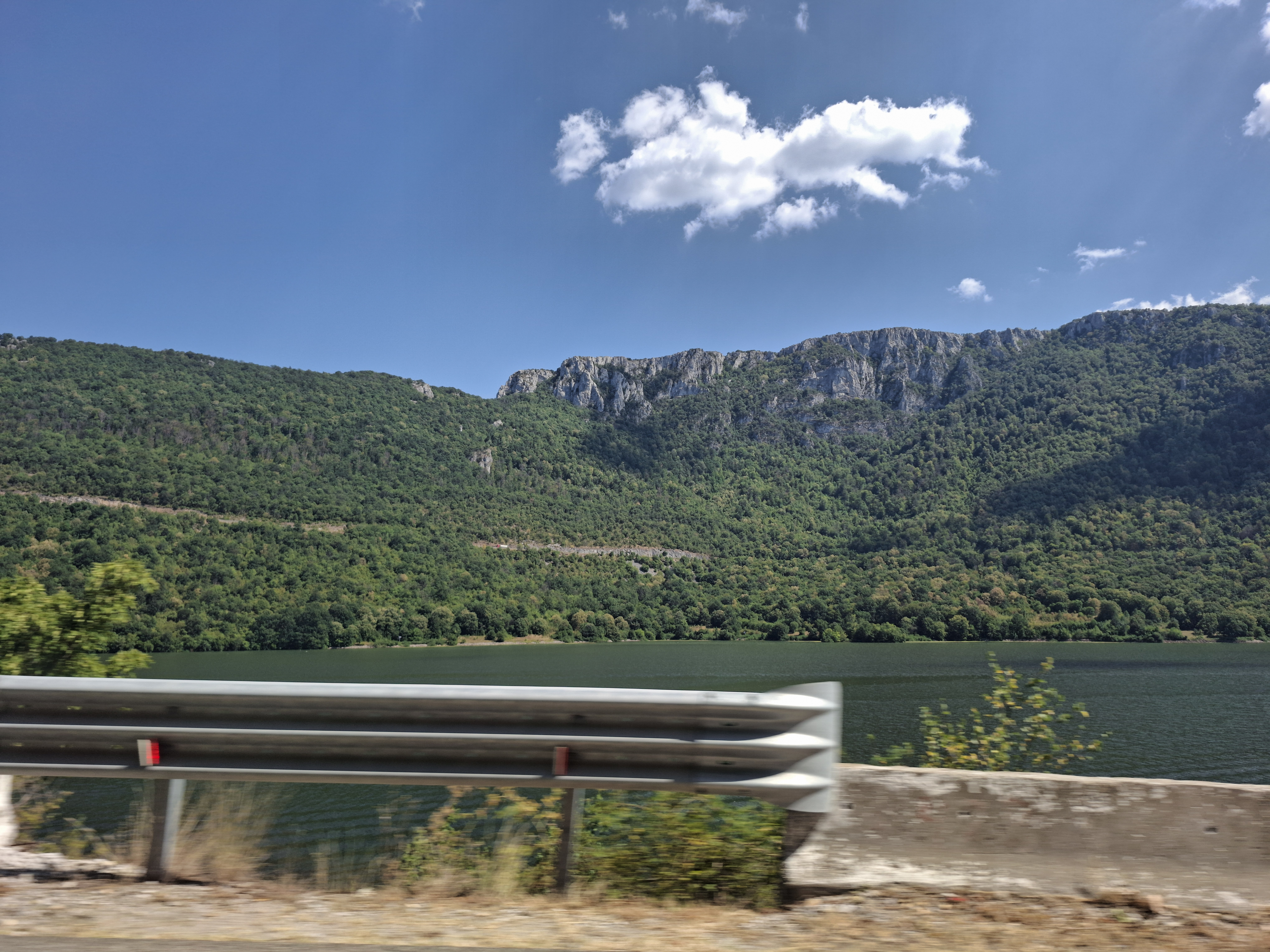
The national park, seen from Romania.

The main feature and attraction of Đerdap National Park's natural beauty is the Đerdap gorge - the famous Iron Gate - the grandiose gateway through the southern slopes of the Carpathian Mountains where the longest and biggest river accumulation in former Yugoslavia is located.

The Đerdap gorge, which is some 100 km (62 mi) long (from Golubac to Tekija), is actually a compound river valley made up of four gorges (Gornja klisura, Gospođin vir, Veliki and Mali kazan and Sipska klisura), separated from each other by ravines. In Gospođin vir, one of the greatest river depths in the world has been measured (82 m (269 ft)). The cliffs of the canyon in Kazan are about 300 m (980 ft) high while the riverbed in this part is narrowed down to 150 m (490 ft).

The terrain is mountainous (Miroč mountain) with numerous caves, pits, gorges, depressions, springs (karstic spring of Blederija on Miroč) and lakes. There are several excellent natural scenic viewpoints, like the Veliki štrbac and Mali štrbac on the Miroč, above the Kazan gorge. Panoramic view includes mountains of Deli Jovan and Veliki Krš in Serbia and the Carpathians in Romania. Viewpoint Greben was named by Jovan Žujović as the "most beautiful hill in the Balkans" at the 1900 Geology congress in Budapest. Another popular feature above the Danube is the hill of Kapetan Mišin breg. The Đerdap is the longest breakthrough type gorge in Europe.

=== Blederija ===
The Blederija river springs from two karstic springs at an altitude of 389 m (1,276 ft), under the Topla Bara peak. The springs are 5 m (16 ft) away from each other and one has a water temperature around 8 °C (46 °F), while the other has a constant 17 °C (63 °F). The river forms several cascades in the heavily forested area before creating the Blederija waterfall, 8 m (26 ft) tall. The average discharge varies greatly and during the catastrophic 2014 Southeast Europe floods, the river heavily flooded its lower valley causing damage. There are several caves left of the waterfall and the scenic viewpoint on the location of former medieval town.

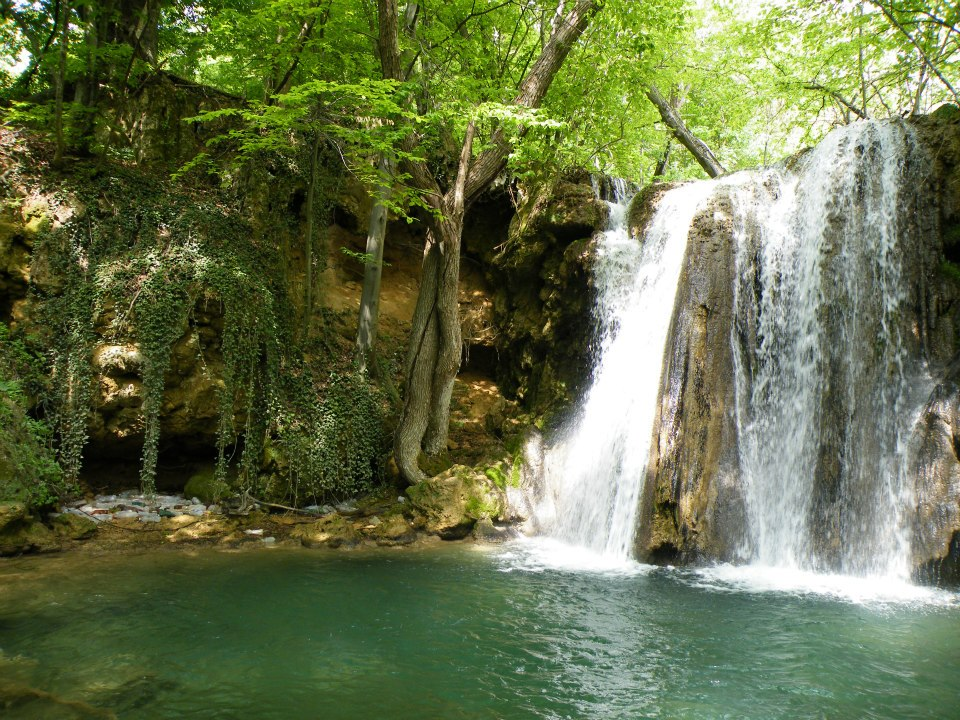
Blederija

The waterfall is 4 km (2.5 mi) away from the closest village, Reka, 12 km (7.5 mi) from Brza Palanka and 31 km (19 mi) from the municipal seat of Kladovo. According to the folk mythology, the water fairies bath under the waterfall. The valley of the river is known for quality honey production. Surrounding area is rich in animal life, especially deer and wild boar, and there are two protected hunting grounds in the vicinity, Vratna and Ploče.

The Blederija continues in the southeast direction and receives rivers of Sokolovica and Suvaja. After receiving the Ravna reka, it continues into the Danube. The area is today heavily forested and scarcely populated, but in the Roman period, the legionaries built a road through this valley, as a shortcut between the locations where the modern towns of Donji Milanovac and Brza Palanka are. It was used by the Roman army until the emperor Trajan cut the road through the Iron Gates gorge itself.

== Name ==
Both Đerdap and former Serbian name for it, Demir-kapija, are Turkish in origin. Demir-kapija means "iron gate" (demirkapı) and a translation of it entered most of the other languages as the name of the gorge. Đerdap comes from girdap which means whirlpool, vortex.

== Power plants ==
The territory of the national park is filled with a series of other important features: abundant and diversified animal and especially plant life, attractive surroundings and landscapes, cultural and historical monuments and other anthropogenic tourist attractions, including a 253 km^{2} (98 sq mi) artificial Lake Đerdap, the largest lake in Serbia, formed by the construction of an Iron Gate I Hydroelectric Power Station (or "Đerdap"). The plant was finished in 1972, being fourth-largest in the world at the time (according to the staff at the power plant). It was a big collaboration project between Yugoslavia and Romania. The power plant employs a large number of the residents of the nearby town of Kladovo. The "Đerdap" power plant record power production was in 1980 of over 7 terawatt-hours (TW·h) electric power. With the building of the second power plant Iron Gate II Hydroelectric Power Station (or "Đerdap" II, 1977–84) and the adjoining Lake Đerdap II 92 km^{2} (36 sq mi), the original power plant became better known as "Đerdap I".

The plans to build "Đerdap III" were also made. It wouldn't be a classical power plant with another dam, but was planned to use the hydro-electrical potential of the already existing Lake Đerdap. The reversible hydro plant was projected in the vicinity of Donji Milanovac, on the park territory in the Pesače section. The original projects are from the late 1960s, when Đerdap I was still in construction. Some preparatory works have been done in the 1970s on the location of Debelo Brdo, upstream of the mouth of the Boljetinska reka into the lake, but the idea was abandoned due to the worsening of the economic situation in Yugoslavia in the late 1970s and the power plant was never built. The concept envisioned the lifting of the lake water by the pumps from the height of 68 m (223 ft), to the projected pools of Pesača and Brodica, with the capacity of 588,000,000 m^{3} (2.08×10^{10} cu ft), and only in the periods of the electricity surplus. During the dry or winter periods, Đerdap II would work as the classical hydro plant but using only stored waters which would fall for 400 m (1,300 ft) onto the turbines. As the entire facility and the auxiliary objects would be built on the bank of the Danube, it would be cheaper than building them on the land, as in thermo-electrical plants, and it would have twice the capacity of the Đerdap I or Kostolac thermal plant. The plant would produce 2,400 megawatts of electricity, which would cover the present consumption in the state and made Serbia an exporter of the electricity. Also, due to the mechanism of the electricity production, it wouldn't have negative consequences on the park's eco-system.

== Wildlife ==
=== Plants ===
Some 1,100 plant species inhabit the park. The include Tertiary relicts like Turkish hazel, walnut tree, European yew, largeleaf linden, downy oak and European holly. The Đerdap's tulip (Tulipa hungarica Borbás), became extinct after the reservoir was formed. Out of 15 species which can be found only on the Balkans are Pančić's maple and certain species of heartsease, wild thyme and meadow fescue. There are also Carpathian endemites like sweet carrot and Seseli rigidum. Internationally protected are floating fern, Fritillaria degeniana, water caltrop, Bulbophyllum loroglossum and cat grass.

There are 57 forest communities found in the park, of which 40 are relict. Relict species include Turkish hazel, Balkan beech, Oriental beech, European bladdernut, Balkan maple and common walnut, which can be traced in the area from the Tertiary.

=== Animals ===
The park is also a home to 150 bird species.

In December 2018, a group of Dalmatian pelicans landed on the lake, close to the power plant. Their closest habitat is the Danube Delta, and they haven't been spotted in the Đerdap since 1914. The group left soon, but the pelicans returned in January 2019. As the birds were continuously spotted in the nesting periods, survey was conducted in June 2021 to confirm pelicans nesting in the area after more than a century. It was also discovered that the wider park area is inhabited by other rare or previously extinct species. Nesting couples of white-winged tern, already extinct from central Serbia, were spotted just south of the park, while the only second nesting locality of yellow-legged gull in Serbia was discovered just to the north. Nests of these gulls haven't been spotted in Serbia since c.1900. Other spotted birds include European roller, woodchat shrike, booted eagle, common tern and greylag goose.

As of the 2020s, there was a stable population of 10 to 12 Eurasian lynx, out of estimated 40 to 60 in the entire Serbia.

== Human history ==
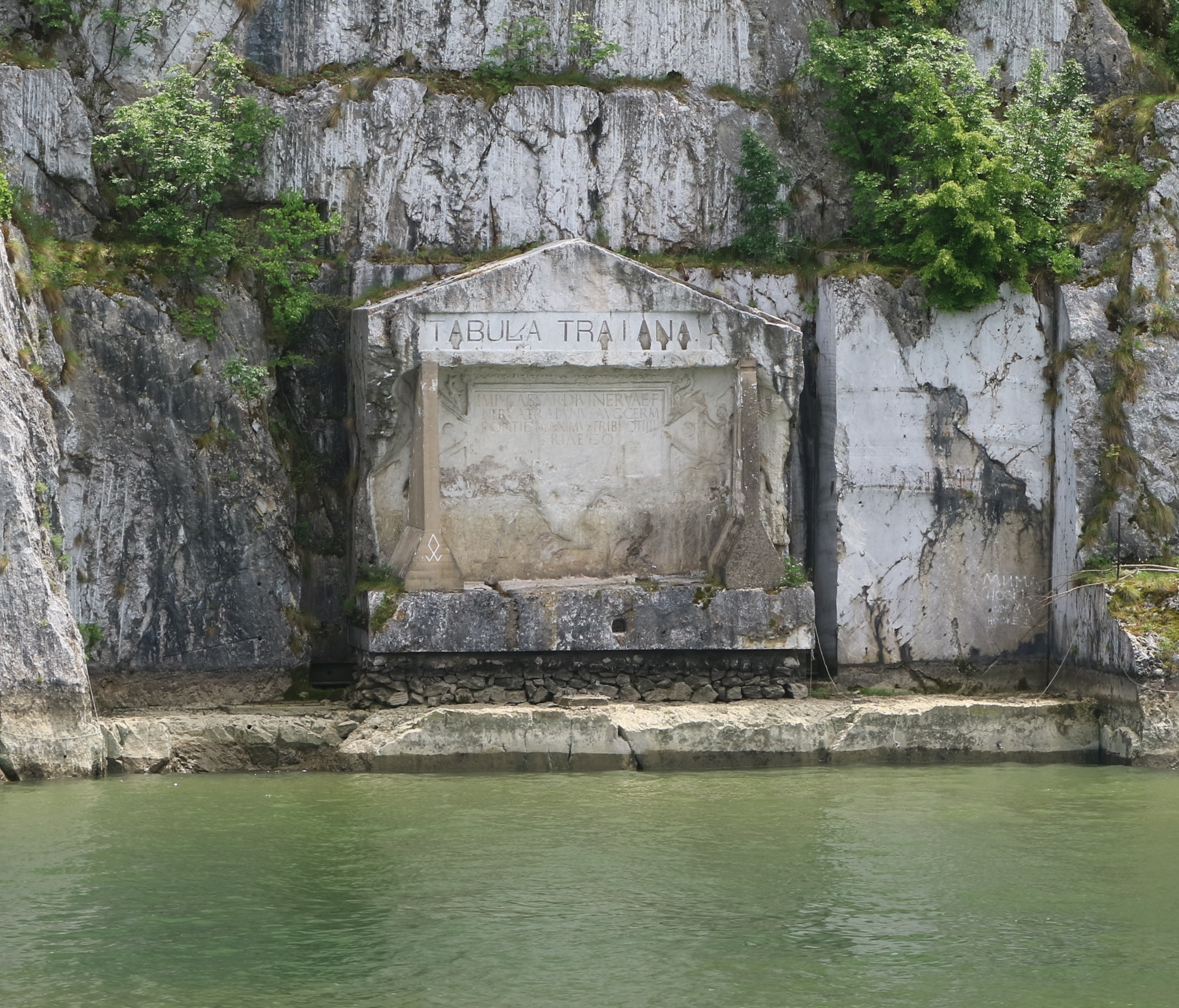
Tabula Traiana

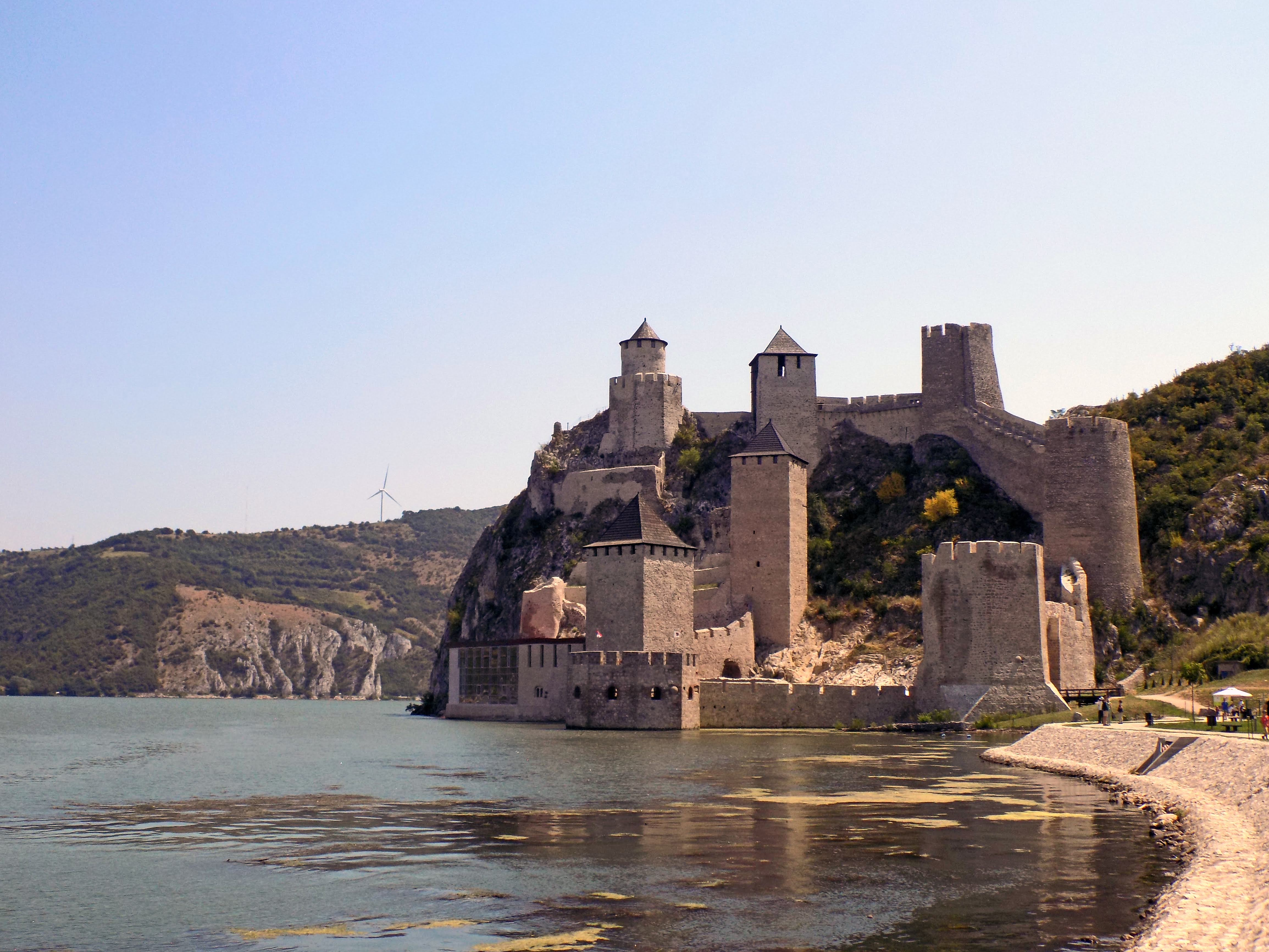
Golubac Fortress

The national park is dotted with many natural and cultural values which are included in a special protection programme. Lepenski Vir is the 11,500-year-old archaeological site with exceptionally important traces of settlements and the life of the Mesolithic and later Neolithic people. Lepenski Vir was discovered in 1967 by Dragoslav Srejović, but from 1965 to 1971 over 30 sites were discovered ranging from the Mesolithic to the Late Middle Ages. Around 800 BC it was part of the transit route of the Triballi, Dacians ant the Autariates while Romans arrived in the first century BC. Đerdap was part of the border zone of the empire and was on the route of the western extension of the Via Militaris. Some remnants of the road still survive. Roman Emperor Trajan built in 105 AD a famed Trajan's Bridge, from which the several pillars survived today so as the Tabula Traiana. There was also a Roman fortress Diana in Kladovo. Altogether, there are 4 cultural monuments and 19 archaeological finds. Major medieval monument is the Golubac fortress with numerous artifacts discovered in it: pottery, iron tools, hatchets, pickaxes, spears, bolts, etc. In the vicinity of the fortress are the remnants of the hammam (bathhouse) and the memorial drinking fountain dedicated to Zawisza the Black, Polish knight who was killed defending the fortress during the 1428 Siege of Golubac.

The region is known for many myths which developed in time. Two of the most popular include the one about the devil face's midget with goat ears and legs, long white beard and the conical hat. He lives in the Danube's whirlpools and shows only at night. He ascends from the depths to drown people who swim in the river or fall off their boats. The other myth is about "beluga", a gigantic sturgeon which arises from the bottom to attack people.

There are 27 settlements in the park territory with the total population of 35,000.

== Protection ==
Apart from being a national park since 1974, Đerdap is also an Important Bird Area and Important Plant Area, and has been nominated for the European Geoparks Network.

In 2020, Đerdap was declared both a European Geopark and the 11th Ramsar site in Serbia. The Ramsar protected area includes the entire area of the national park with the addition of Mala Vrbica, the Important Bird Area located outside of the park. The wetlands developed after the artificial lake was created, which elevated the underground waters also, causing frequent flooding of the surrounding area.

== Tourism ==
Đerdap National Park has become one of the most visited tourist regions in Serbia especially after the construction of the dam and the formation of the large lake. The gorge and the hydroelectric power plant can be visited from Belgrade and other cities downstream from it. There are a number of tourist points in the park with hotel and other facilities, offering tourists rest and swimming and tours of the cultural and historical monuments and natural values. Though the Danube river is quite polluted by international standards, fishing is still very popular. Some large specimens of catfish have weighed in at over 100 kg (220 lb).
