= Pek (river) =

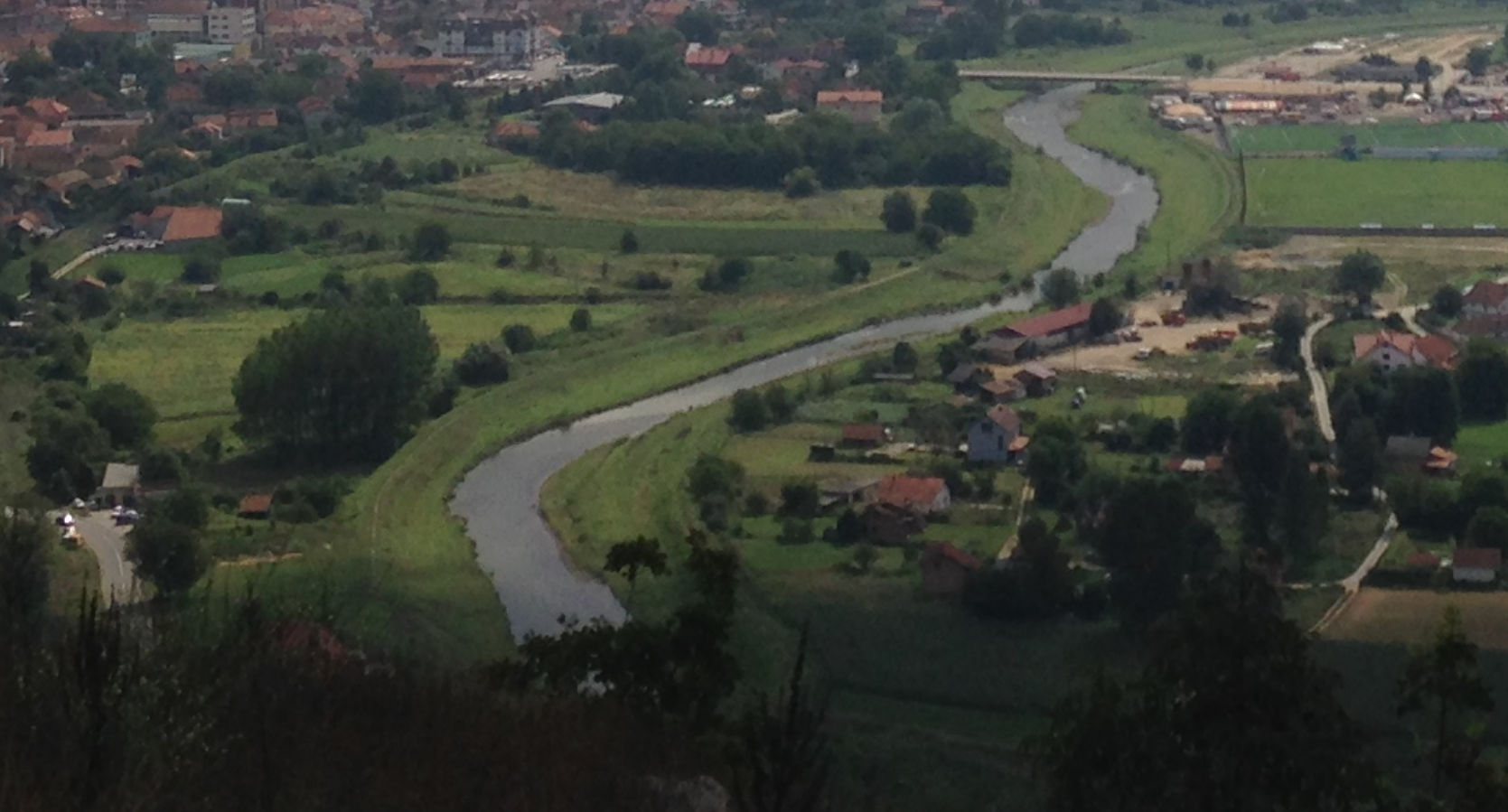

Location
- Country: Serbia

Physical characteristics
- Mouth
  - location: Danube
  - coordinates: 44.76721°N 21.53561°E
- Length: 129 km (80 mi)
- Basin size: 1,236 km^{2} (477 sq mi)

Basin features
- Progression: Danube→ Black Sea

The Pek (Serbian Cyrillic: Пек) is a river in eastern Serbia. It is a 129 km long right tributary of the Danube, flowing through the regions of Homolje, Zvižd and Braničevo. The river got a moniker Golden Pek, being one of the most gold-bearing rivers in Europe, with some of its tributaries bearing even more gold.

== Homolje region ==
The Pek originates from two major headwaters, Veliki Pek and Mali Pek (Serbian Cyrillic: Велики Пек and Мали Пек; Great Pek and Little Pek).

The Mali Pek comes down from the northern slopes of the Liškovac mountain, flows to the southwest through the city of Majdanpek, one of the major mining centers of Serbia (city's name itself, Majdan-pek, means Mine on the Pek). After a short course, the Pek reaches the western side of the Homolje mountains and flows in into the river Lipa at the village of Debeli Lug. Measured from the Lipa source, Pek is 129 km long, measured from its own, 110 km.

Near the confluence of the two rivers is the reservoir of Veliki Zaton (or Valja Fundata), artificial body of water used as a tailing pond for the nearby mines.

The Lipa (or Veliki Pek) springs out on the western side of the Veliki Krš mountain, near the village of Lipa. It flows straight to the north, following the western side of the Mali Krš mountain, next to the villages of Vlaole, Jasikovo (where it receives the left tributary Jagnjilo/Јагњило) and Leskovo before it meets the Pek.

Shortly after the confluence of Lipa and Mali Pek, the river receives the small stream of Todorov (Cyrillic: Тодоров) from the left, and Železnik (Cyrillic: Желеник) from the right. The Pek continues to the north, curves between the mountains of Homolje and northern Kučaj, next to the villages of Blagojev Kamen and receives the rivers Brodica from the right and Komša and Kisela Voda from the left.

== Zvižd region ==
This section of the river course both begins and ends with a gorge. At the village of Rečica, the Pek enters the Kučevska klisura (Cyrillic: Кучевска клисура; Gorge of Kučevo). The river receives from the left the stream Gložana (Cyrillic: Гложана) and from the right the Dajša (Cyrillic: Дајша), makes an elbow turn to the north at the village of Neresnica, leaves the gorge and enters the Kučevska kotlina (Cyrillic: Кучевска котлина; Depression of Kučevo) where the regional center Kučevo is located. The Pek continues to the north through the Kaonska klisura (Cyrillic: Каонска клисура; Gorge of Kaona), between the villages of Kaona and Turija. The river makes another elbow turn, next to the villages of Sena, Lješnica and Mišljenovac and enters Braničevo.

== Braničevo region ==
In the final section, the Pek gently makes a big curve to the east. Braničevo is the lowest part of the Pek valley, so the river spills in several arms and passes next to many villages (Zelenik, Klenje, Mrčkovac, Miljević, Šuvajić, Donja Kruševica, Tribrode, Braničevo, Kusiće, before it empties into the Danube east of the town of Veliko Gradište. In this section, important left tributary is the Češljebarska reka (Cyrillic: Чешљебарска река).

== Characteristics ==
The Pek drains an area of 1,236 km^{2} and belongs to the Black Sea drainage basin. It is not navigable.

The river's course is characterized by many elbow turns, similar to the Danube's on this same section (most notably, the Đerdap), but on a much lesser scale. Average discharge is 10.5 m³/s and the river's mouth is known for the Danube's inverse flow (during high levels, water from the Danube flows up the Pek).

=== Gold ===
The areas surrounding the Pek's course are rich in a variety of ores and minerals, like copper, iron, pyrite, zinc, wolfram and coal (Rakova Bara coalmine), but the river is famous for the gold which it brings from the mountains around Majdanpek in small amounts, so from time to time, a media coverage of the gold findings (more often used as a publicity stunts) provoke gold rush in the region. For this, the river is nicknamed Zlatni Pek (Cyrillic: Златни Пек; Golden Pek).

It is known that the Romans exploited gold from the river and its surrounding in the 2nd century. The exploitation was continued in medieval Serbia, but the extraction stopped during the Ottoman period, to be restored in the late 19th century. Austro-Hungarian naturalist and traveller Felix Kanitz who visited the Pek area in 1858, wrote that the old name of the town of Kučevo was "Chrisovehia" (meaning "Old Gold[en Land]", in Serbian "Starozlatija"). During the Interbellum, an excavator owned by the royal Karađorđević dynasty was dredging the river at Neresnica in search of gold. It was the second largest excavator in the world at the time, behind another gigantic one in India. The preparations began in 1930, and the excavator became operational on 12 October 1934. It was filtering 25 to 32 kg (55 to 71 lb) of gold per week. In total, it excavated some 7 tons of 22-carat gold before the outbreak of World War II.

After the 1950s, gold extraction switched to separation from the copper ore, while the traditional way of gold panning almost completely died out. The mining industry collapsed in Serbia since the 1990s. The most symptomatic example of this in the Pek valley is the village of Blagojev Kamen. The settlement encompasses the former gold mine of the same name. The mine became operational in 1902. In 1953, Blagojev Kamen had a population of 1,258, elementary school, cultural institutions, cinema, etc. The mine was closed in 1961 and the population tumbled down to 26 in 2011. When the reporters visited the place in 2019, only 10 people were in the village which was completely desolated and ruined. Though gold was excavated and acquired as byproduct on numerous locations throughout Serbia, Blagojev Kamen was the only proper gold mine in Serbia, where only gold was mined. An attempt to revive the production in the mid-1990s, ended in 2001 when the mine was again closed.

The traditional placer mining, in the form of gold panning, is the most used type of gold prospecting, and has survived until the 21st century, though the number of prospectors dropped. Wooden and modernized plastic pans are used. A thick sheep's fleece can be used for filtering of the sand, too. It takes an estimated 2 m^{3} (71 cu ft) of sand and sludge to be filtered in order to obtain 0.5 g (0.018 oz) of gold, if gold is present in the deposit brought by the river as the deposits of gold are at the depth of 4 to 5 m (13 to 16 ft). Discovered gold nuggets are mostly small with some larger recorded from 5 to 28 g (0.18 to 0.99 oz), with the largest recorded nugget having 103 g (3.6 oz).

== Pollution ==
Flowing through the mining and heavily industrialized areas, the river is notorious for the pollution for decades. Waters from the Serbia Zijin Bor Copper complex are being discharged directly into the river. The pollution and murkiness of the river grew since the late 2010s. The contract with the Chinese owner since 2018, the Zijin Mining, allows them to discharge untreated wastewater. Measurements in March 2021, showed that concentrations of various elements were way over the allowed reference values, including sulfur, copper (doubled), manganese (10 times) and iron (12 times).

After the report on pollution became public, Zijin refused to communicate with anyone: local population and administration, environmentalist organizations and reporters. Unofficial reports from April 2021 showed that the company stopped discharging wastewater from the Jama mine in Majdanpek, which was considered the main pollutant, with intention to solve the problem. Environmentalists considered this a victory. Then the Minister of Mining and Energy Zorana Mihajlović stated that it was actually the government which temporary closed the mine, cause they sent an inspection to the Jama. Asked why the government didn't react earlier, she indirectly accused grand corruption. This prompted "Zijin" to issue a statement that the inspection only ordered halting of the construction of the new ventilation shafts, and that mine is not shut down. In May 2021, Zijin stated they fulfilled all requirements of the inspection, and even more, by cleaning some 300 metres (980 ft) of Mali Pek, one of Pek's two headstreams, from waste sediments which were building up for decades.

== See also ==
- List of rivers of Serbia

== Sources ==
- Mala Prosvetina Enciklopedija, Third edition (1985); Prosveta; ISBN 86-07-00001-2
- Jovan Đ. Marković (1990): Enciklopedijski geografski leksikon Jugoslavije; Svjetlost-Sarajevo; ISBN 86-01-02651-6
