= Porečka River =

- Native name: Поречка река (Serbian)

Location
- Country: Serbia

Physical characteristics
- Source
  - location: Liškovac mountain, east of Majdanpek (as Šaška River)
- Mouth
  - location: Danube, near Donji Milanovac
  - coordinates: 44.4696°N 22.1759°E
- Length: 50 km (31 mi)
- Basin size: 538 km^{2} (208 sq mi)

Basin features
- Progression: Danube→ Black Sea

The Porečka River (Serbian: Поречка река / Porečka reka, lit. 'Poreč River') is a river in eastern Serbia, a 50 km-long right tributary to the Danube in the Đerdap Gorge. It originates from two headstreams, the Šaška and the Crnajka rivers, which meet at the village of Miloševa Kula.

== Origin ==
The Crnajka river, the shorter but natural headstream, originates from the central west slopes of the Deli Jovan mountain, and flows to the north, next to the villages of Tanda and Crnajka, in the valley between the Deli Jovan to the east and Veliki Krš and Mali Krš mountains to the west.

The Šaška River, the longer headstream (17 km), originates from the northern slopes of the Liškovac mountain, under the mountain's highest peak, Veliki Liškovac, east of the town of Majdanpek. The river flows to the south, curving around the western side of the Liškovac mountain and the northern slopes of the Mali Krš mountain, next to the oldest copper mine in Europe and once prosperous mining village of Rudna Glava. It meets the Crnajka in the narrow valley between the southern Liškovac and northern Deli Jovan mountains, at the village of Miloševa Kula, forming the Porečka River.

== Poreč ==
For the remaining 23 km the river flows under the name of Porečka River, diving in two the narrow valley and region of Poreč (Serbian for land alongside the river or river valley). The river continues Crnajka's northerly direction between the mountains of Liškovac (on the west) and Veliki Greben (on the east).

The major settlements on the river are the villages of Klokočevac, Topolnica and Mosna, and the small town of Donji Milanovac (in medieval times also called Poreč) near the river's mouth into the Danube in the Đerdap Gorge. After the construction of the Đerdap hydro electrical dam, the river flows into the artificial lake Đerdap, and the flooded final section of the Porečka river today forms a small bay of the lake.

The Porečka River drains an area of 538 km², belongs to the Black Sea drainage basin and it is not navigable.
