= Negotin Valley =

Geographical subregion of the Timok Valley, Serbia

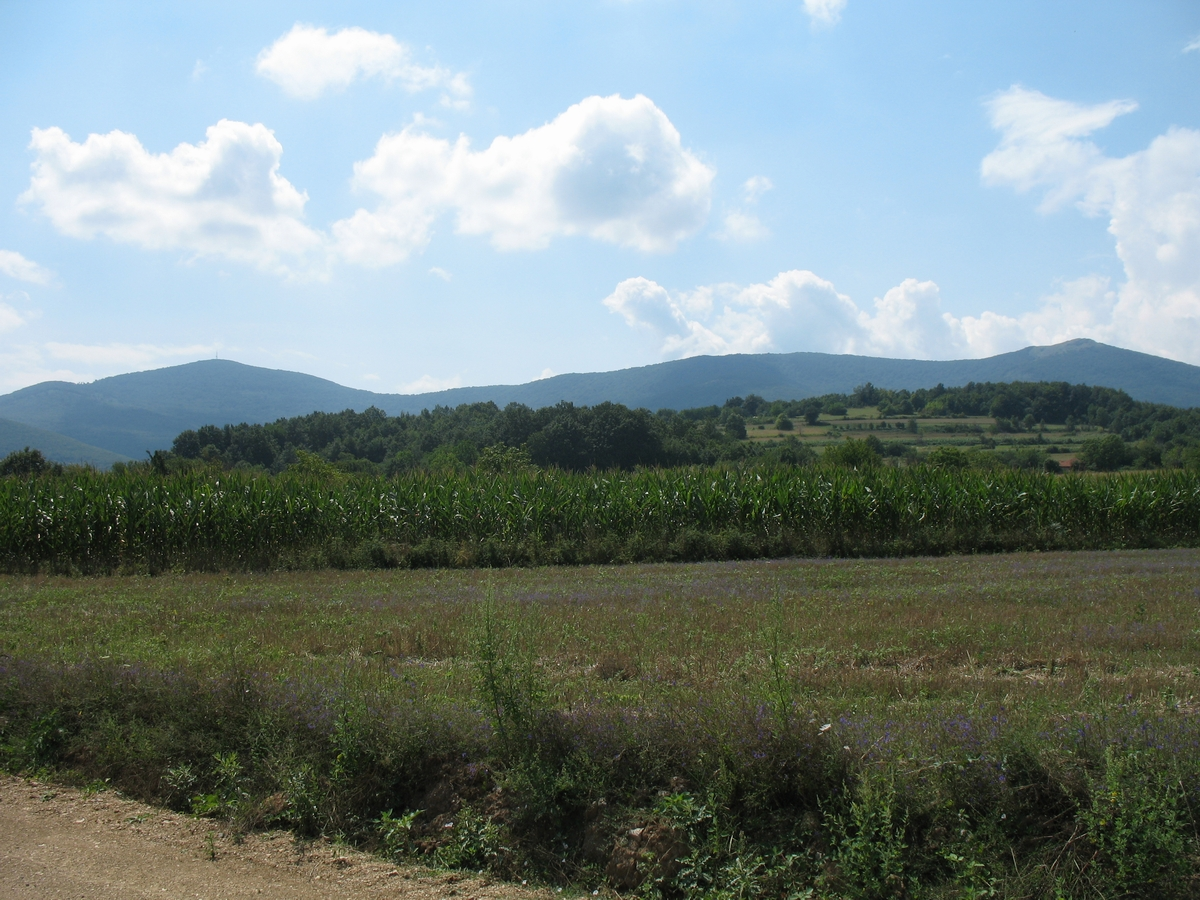
Deli Jovan, a mountain near Negotin which marks the western border of the Negotin Valley

The Negotin Valley (Serbian: Неготинска Крајина, romanized: Negotinska Krajina, lit. 'Negotin Frontier'; Romanian: Valea Negotinului) is a geographical subregion of the Timok Valley in eastern Serbia.

The region is centered around the city of Negotin. However, the borders of the region are not firmly defined. To the east, it is delimited by the Danube and Timok rivers, and to the west, by the Veliki Greben and Deli Jovan mountains. However, there are no certain geographic features to the north or south. The southern border can be interpreted as the Jelašnička River, while the northern one extends to Reka. It is agreed that the region is made up of several main centers: Negotin, Brza Palanka and since World War I, Salaš and Brusnik.

The region has unusual climatic features and hydropotential and geomorphologic sites.

== See also ==
- List of regions of Serbia
- Romanians in Serbia
