= Blederija =

Waterfall in Serbia

- (Serbian: Бледерија)
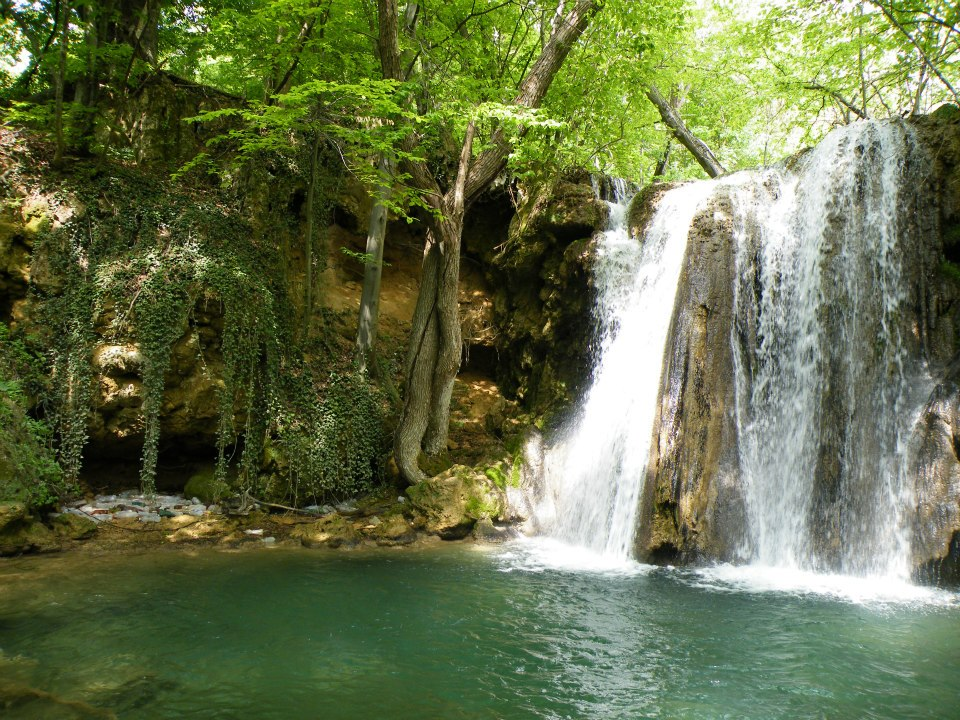
- Blederija waterfall
- Interactive map of Blederija
- Location: Reka, Kladovo Serbia
- Nearest city: Kladovo
- Coordinates: 44°30′35″N 22°22′14″E
- Area: 398.86 ha (985.6 acres)
- Established: December 2019
- Governing body: Kladovo Touristic Organization
- Website: tookladovo.rs

The Blederija (Serbian Cyrillic: Бледерија) is a natural monument in eastern Serbia. It was placed under the state protection as the geological phenomenon and includes various geological formations (karstic springs, caves, waterfall) in the watershed of the Blederija river, on the Miroč mountain.

== Location ==
The reserve is located on the central-eastern slopes of the Miroč mountain.

The waterfall, as the central feature of the area, is 4 km (2.5 mi) away from the closest village, Reka, 12 km (7.5 mi) from Brza Palanka and 31 km (19 mi) from the municipal seat of Kladovo.

== Geography ==
The Blederija river springs from four karstic springs on the Miroč, at an altitude of 389 m (1,276 ft), under the Topla Bara peak. The springs are 5 m (16 ft) away from each other. Some are icy cold, while the others are sub-thermal - one has a water temperature around 8 °C (46 °F), the other has a constant 17 °C (63 °F).

The river forms several cascades in the heavily forested area before forming the 8 m (26 ft) tall Blederija waterfall after the flow of 2 km (1.2 mi). Water falls over the tufa bar in the curtain style, forming the plunge pool in the form of tufa tub. It holds small lake with turquoise water color. Downstream there is another, even shallower lake. From there, after several cascades, the stream reaches the valley.

There are several caves left of the waterfall and the scenic viewpoint on the location of former medieval town. The largest is the Sokolovica cave, from which the brook of the same name springs. It is 2.5 km (1.6 mi) away from the waterfall, downstream of the former town. The cave is neither arranged nor opened for the visitors. The spring in the cave is intermittent and in the form of a water well (vrelo).

The Blederija continues in the southeast direction and receives rivers of Sokolovica (downstream from the Grad locality) and Suvaja. Rivers carved a small, picturesque limestone gorge, with several pronounced narrows and waterfalls. Its total length is only 4.3 km (2.7 mi). After receiving the Ravna reka, it continues into the Danube under the name of Račka Reka or simply the Reka. The average discharge varies greatly and during the catastrophic 2014 Southeast Europe floods, the river heavily flooded its lower valley causing damage. However, during normal water levels, the river can be crossed on foot in some sections, though there are several small bridges across it.

== Wildlife ==
Lush forests include common beech, common hornbeam and various oak species: durmast oak, Hungarian oak, Austrian oak. There are 78 species of medicinal plants in the reserve.

The valley of the river is known for quality honey production. Surrounding area is rich in animal life, especially deer and wild boar, and there are two protected hunting grounds in the vicinity, Vratna and Ploče.

== Human history ==
The area is today heavily forested and scarcely populated, but in the Roman period, the legionaries built a road through this valley, as a shortcut between the locations where the modern Danubian towns of Donji Milanovac and Brza Palanka are. It was used by the Roman army until the emperor Trajan cut the road through the Iron Gates gorge itself.

The town was located on the river during the Middle Ages. The locality is today known simply as "Grad" ("town").

According to the folk mythology, the water fairies bath under the waterfall.

== Protection ==
The Blederija river's watershed was declared a natural monument in December 2019. Richness and variety of the complex's geodiversity are named among the reasons for state protection. The protected area includes four springs which form the river, a natural reservoir in the lower section of the river valley, the Sokolovica spring cave, a small limestone gorge and the water cascades. The area is placed in the II category of protection.

Total protected area covers 398.86 ha (985.6 acres). Of that, 237 ha (590 acres) is privately owned.

Just north of the protected area is the much larger Đerdap national park, which includes the long Iron Gates gorge carved by the Danube, and northern section of the Miroč mountain. Established in 1974, the park was declared the first UNESCO global geopark in Serbia in July 2020.

Protection of Blederija was marked in June 2021, when Pošta Srbije, Serbian national postal service, issued commemorative stamps and envelopes with artistic representation of the park.

== Tourism ==
Until 2019, Belderija was almost unknown to the non-local population and was nicknamed :the best kept secret of Đerdap". Number of visitors grew since it came into the spotlight thanks to the establishment of the natural reserve. Plans are made to build the proper road into the reserve, direct access path to the waterfall, tourist signs, guardhouse, etc. However, environmentalists pointed out that, even still rare visitors, litter the area, leaving plastic bottles and bags, and that access maybe should be limited.
