= Poreč (disambiguation) =

Poreč is a town and municipality in Croatia.

Poreč may also refer to:

- Poreč, Kutjevo, a village in the municipality of Kutjevo, Croatia
- Poreč, the old name for Donji Milanovac, a town in Serbia
- Poreč (region), a region in Serbia
  - Gornji Poreč ('Upper Poreč'), a region in Serbia
  - Donji Poreč ('Lower Poreč'), a region in Serbia
- Poreče, a region in North Macedonia

== See also ==
- Porečje (disambiguation)
- Porečka River ('Poreč River'), a river in Serbia
- Miholjački Poreč, a village in the municipality of Donji Miholjac, Croatia
