= Dositije Novaković =

Serbian Orthodox monk

- Born: 1784
- Died: 1854 (aged 69–70)
- Occupation: Orthodox monk
- Known for: Participating in the First Serbian Uprising

Dositije Novaković (Cyrillic Serbian: Доситије Новаковић; 1784–1854) was a Serbian Orthodox monk and revolutionary who participated in the First Serbian Uprising.

== Life and career ==
Novaković was born in the village of Dabnica, near Prilep in Old Serbia in 1784. He received a good elementary and high school education and went on to study theology at a Seminary before taking monastic orders at Zograf monastery on the sacred island of Mount Athos. Unable to endure Turkish interference in ecclesiastical affairs, he fled to Serbia where he found peace at Gornjak Monastery.

When the First Serbian Uprising broke out in 1804, he joined the insurgents as a military priest for the next decade until the rebellion was crushed by the massive Ottoman army in 1813. Then he went back to Gornjak where he stayed for a while until the time came when Serbian borders were moved from Miroč to Timok. He played a crucial role in establishing a Serbian Orthodox Eparchy in the region and consequently, he became its first bishop. He was consecrated at the same time when Ilija Garašanin's Načertenje invoked in 1844 in Kragujevac.

At first, his see was in Zaječar and later was relocated to Negotin, where he remained until he died on 2 April 1854.
