= Taliata =

Roman town and fort in eastern Serbia

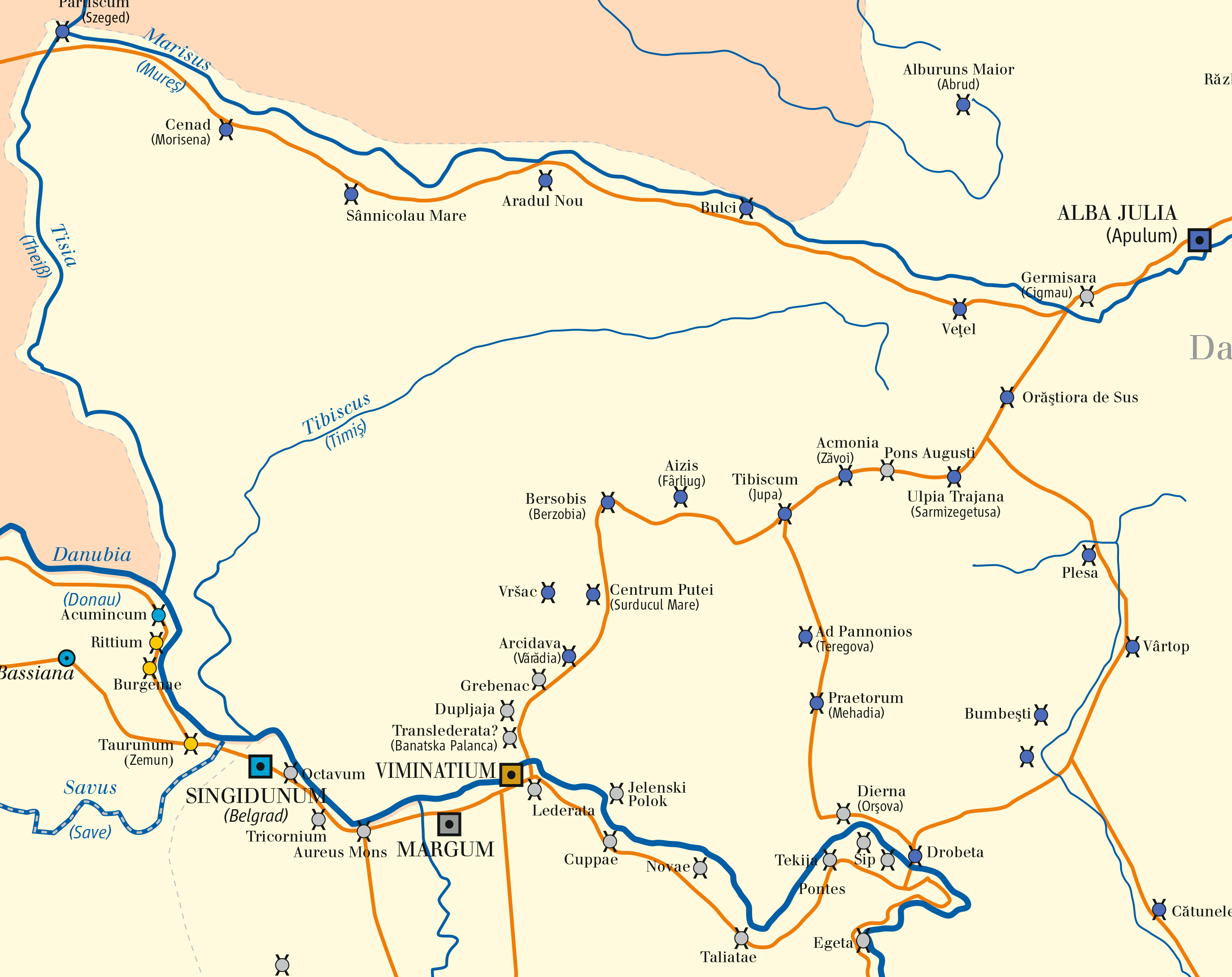
Western Moesian/Dacian forts

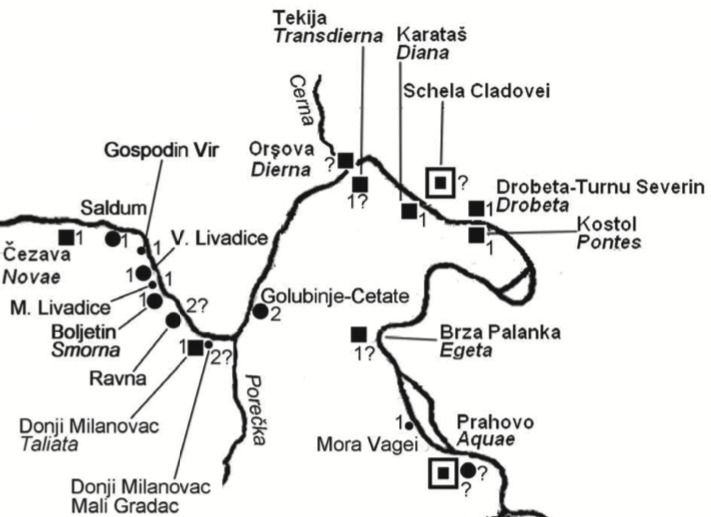
Forts on western Moesian Limes

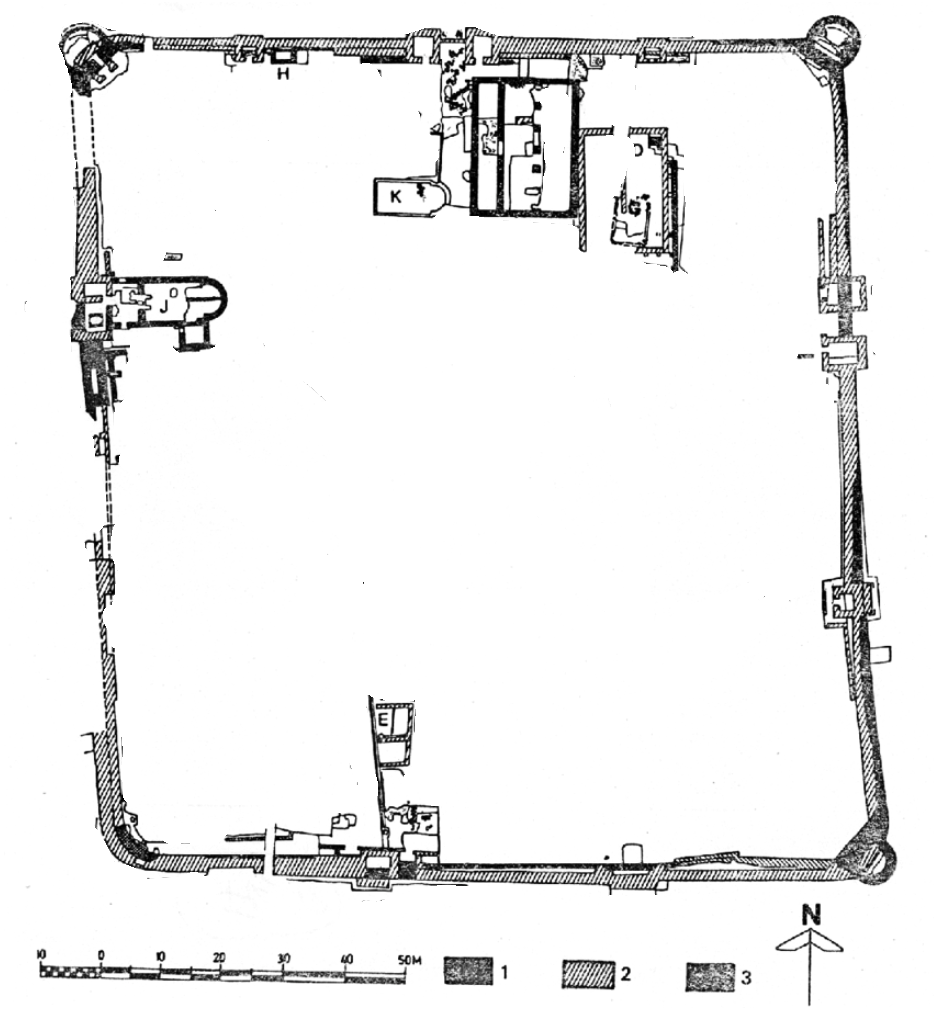
Taliata plan

Taliata was a Roman town and fort located near the present town of Donji Milanovac in eastern Serbia. It is included in the Tabula Peutingeriana.

The fort of 134 × 126 m was built as part of the Roman Moesian Limes frontier system of linked forts along the Danube. Domitian replaced the wood and earth walls by stone walls in 87 AD before Domitian's Dacian War.

It was completely restored in the second half of the 3rd century. In the 4th c. protruding semicircular corner-towers were added.

An early Christian basilica was discovered on the site.

== Sources ==
- V. Popović, Donji Milanovac–Veliki Gradac (Taliata), rimsko i ranovizantijsko uvrdenje, Starinar 33–34, 1982–1983, 265–282.
