= Stol (Serbian Carpathians) =

Mountain in Serbia

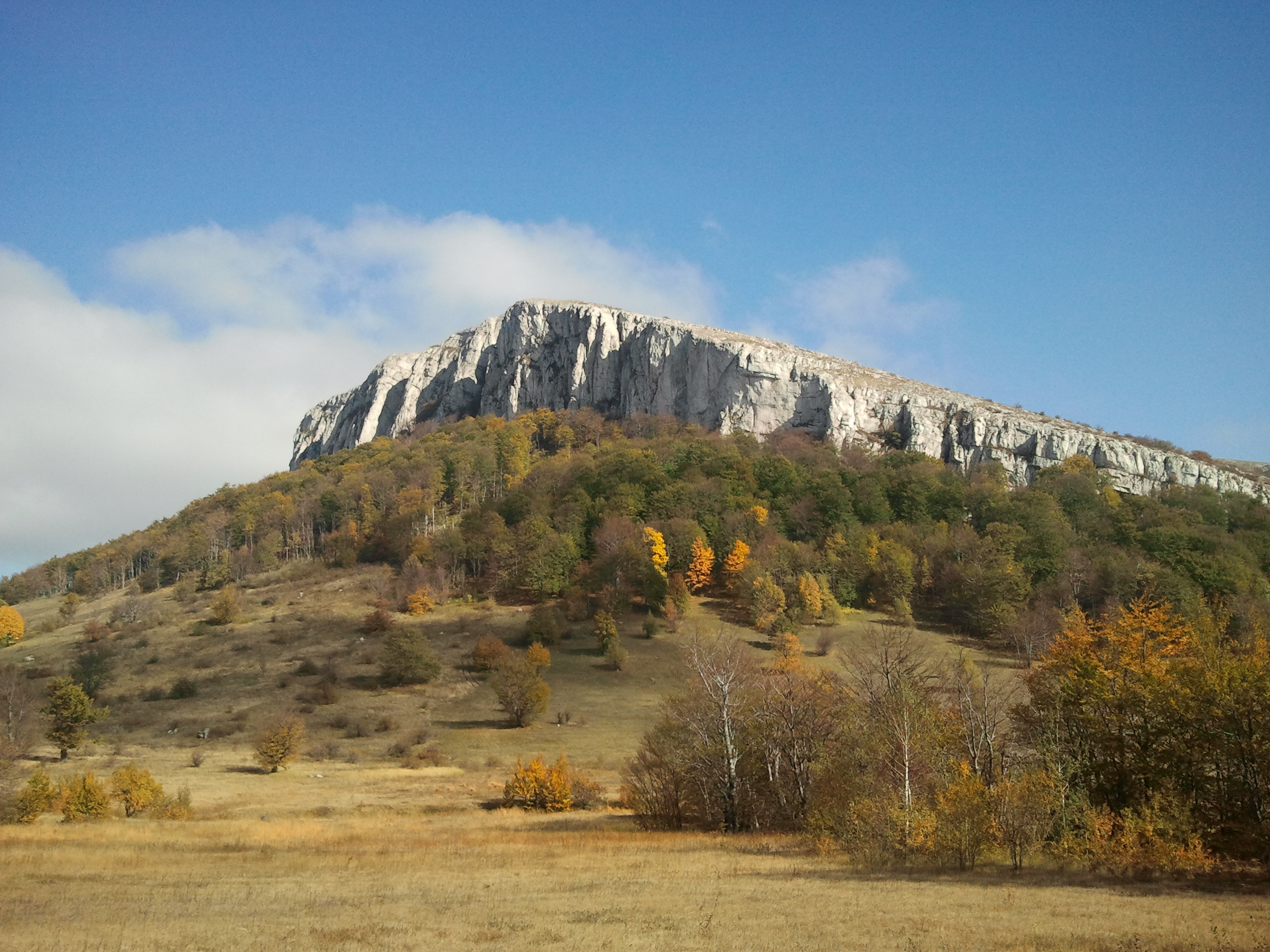

Highest point
- Elevation: 1,156 m (3,793 ft)
- Coordinates: 44°10′38″N 22°08′21″E

Geography
- Location within Serbia
- Location: Eastern Serbia
- Parent range: Carpathian Mountains

Stol (Serbian Cyrillic: Стол) is a mountain in eastern Serbia, near the town of Bor. Its highest peak has an elevation of 1,156 meters above sea level. Like nearby Veliki Krš and Mali Krš, Stol has a number of pronounced karst formations. There is a mountain hut with around 35 beds, maintained by the mountaineering society Crni Vrh from Bor.

Stol is a developed climbing spot, with 68 bolted routes, difficulties from 4c to 8a+.

== See also ==
- List of mountains in Serbia
