= Neresnica =

- Village
- Location within Serbia
- Coordinates: 44°26′33″N 21°43′33″E
- Country: Serbia
- District: Braničevo District
- Municipality: Kučevo
- Time zone: UTC+1 (CET)
  - Summer (DST): UTC+2 (CEST)

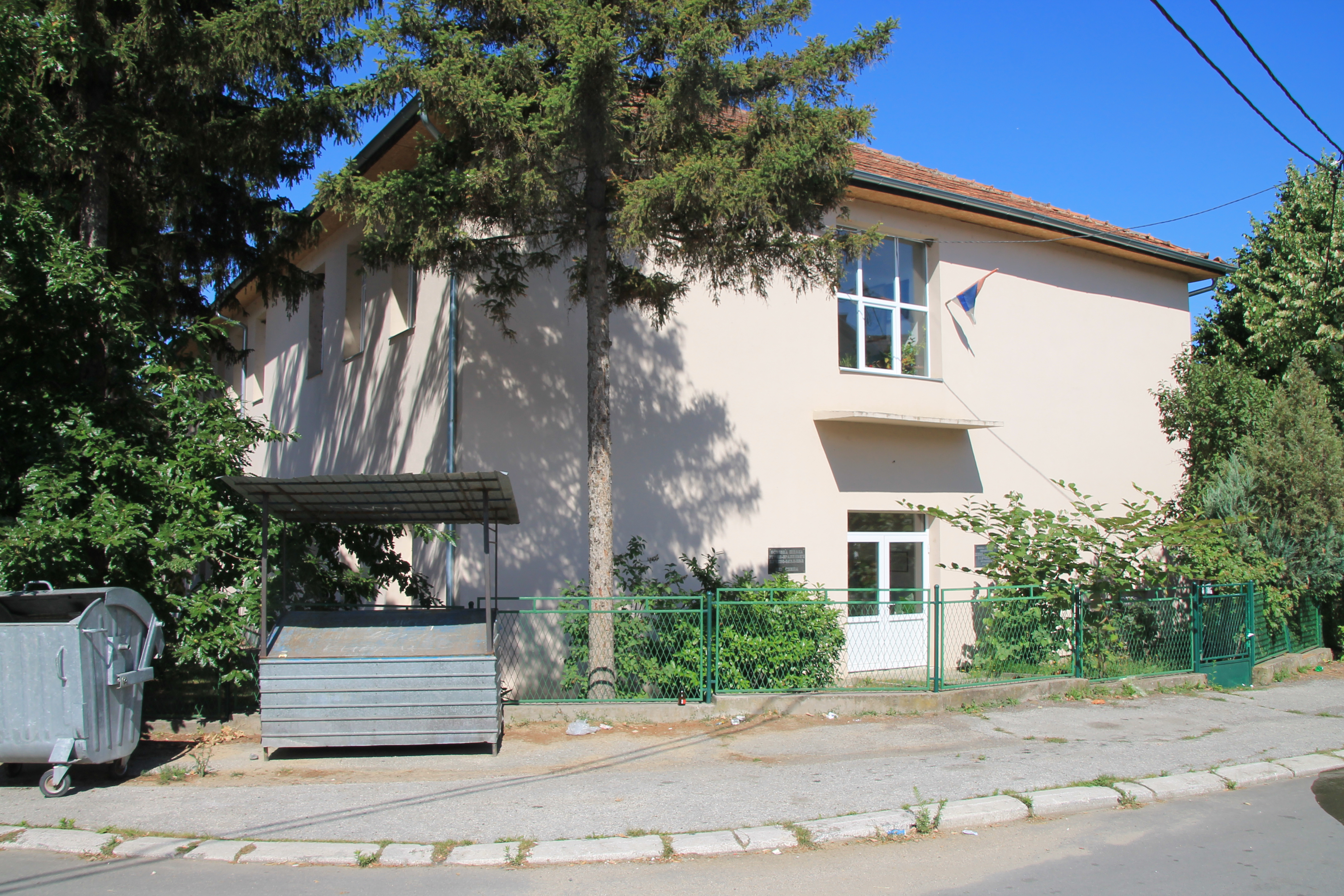
Neresnica (Kučevo)

Neresnica is a small village in the municipality of Kučevo, Serbia. It is made of four subregions: Komsa, Lunka, Popovac, Glozana and Kisela voda. According to the 2002 census, the town has a population of 2365 people including Goran.
