= Porečje =

Porečje may refer to:

- Leskovačko Porečje, a region in Serbia
- Poreče, a region in North Macedonia
