= Bulbophyllum concavibasalis =

Scientific classification
- Kingdom: Plantae
- Clade: Embryophytes
- Clade: Tracheophytes
- Clade: Spermatophytes
- Clade: Angiosperms
- Clade: Monocots
- Order: Asparagales
- Family: Orchidaceae
- Subfamily: Epidendroideae
- Genus: Bulbophyllum
- Species: B. concavibasalis

Binomial name
- Bulbophyllum concavibasalis P.Royen

Species of orchid

Bulbophyllum concavibasalis is a species of orchid in the genus Bulbophyllum. It grows well in many tropical places such as PNG and Indonesia. It tends to grow individually with one flower per plant.
