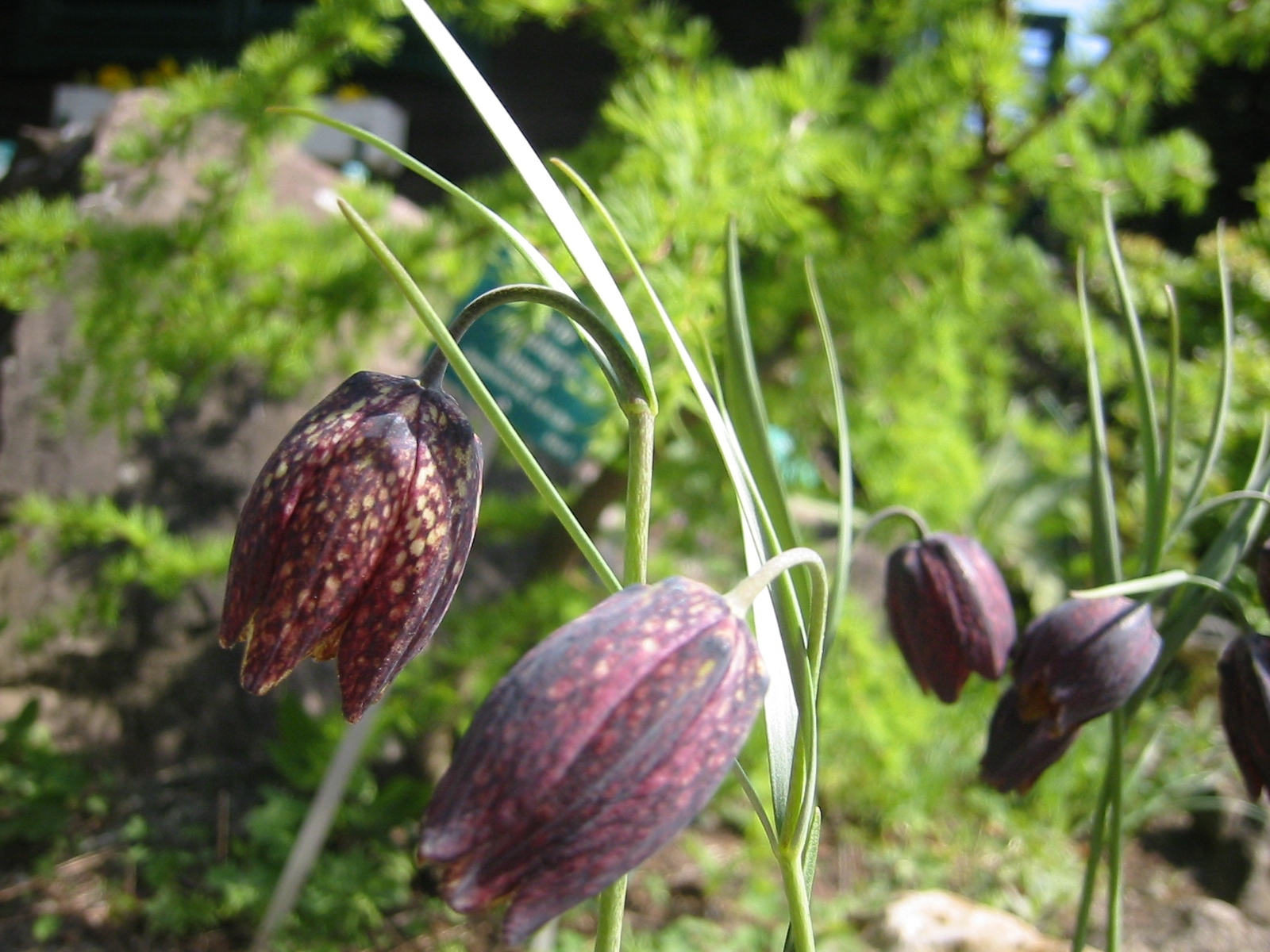

Conservation status
- Data Deficient (IUCN 3.1)

Scientific classification
- Kingdom: Plantae
- Clade: Tracheophytes
- Clade: Angiosperms
- Clade: Monocots
- Order: Liliales
- Family: Liliaceae
- Subfamily: Lilioideae
- Genus: Fritillaria
- Species: F. montana

Binomial name
- Fritillaria montana Hoppe ex W.D.J.Koch

Synonyms
- Synonymy: Fritillaria gawleri Jaub. & Spach; Fritillaria orsiniana Parl.; Fritillaria caussolensis Goaty & Pons ex Ardoino; Fritillaria intermedia N.Terracc.; Fritillaria pollinensis N.Terracc.; Fritillaria degeniana J.Wagner; Fritillaria liburnica B.Lengyel

= Fritillaria montana =

Species of flowering plant

Fritillaria montana is a European species of flowering plant in the lily family Liliaceae, native to southern and eastern Europe: France, Italy, Austria, Hungary, former Yugoslavia (all 7 parts), Albania, Bulgaria, Greece, Romania, Ukraine, European Russia.
