= Veliki Greben =

Mountain in Serbia

- Location within Serbia

Highest point
- Elevation: 656 m (2,152 ft)
- Coordinates: 44°21′18″N 22°14′45″E

Geography
- Location: Eastern Serbia
- Parent range: Carpathian Mountains

Veliki Greben (Serbian Cyrillic: Велики Гребен, meaning "great ridge") is a mountain in eastern Serbia, near the town of Donji Milanovac. Its highest peak, Crni vrh, has an elevation of 656 meters above sea level. Veliki Greben extends in north–south direction, along the right bank of Porečka river to its confluence in Danube.

== See also ==
- List of mountains in Serbia
