= Tabula Traiana =

Roman memorial plaque in Serbia

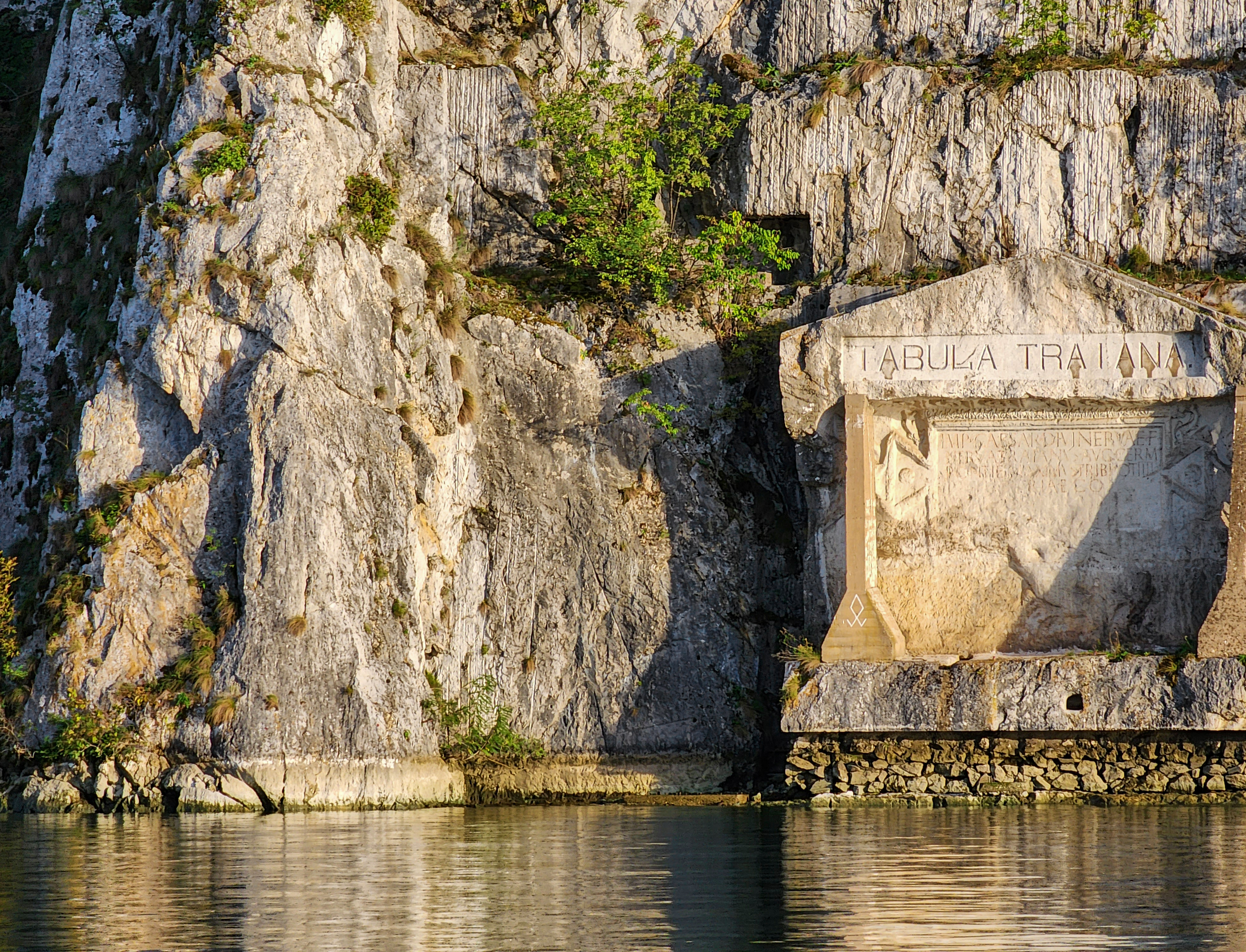
- The relocated Tabula Traiana. The top inscription and othala rune are modern.
- Interactive map of Tabula Traiana
- 44°39′17″N 22°18′35″E
- Location: Iron Gates, near Kladovo, Serbia

History
- Built: AD 100

Cultural Heritage of Serbia

The Tabula Traiana or Trajan's Plaque is a Roman memorial plaque found on the Serbian side of the Iron Gates of the Danube. The plaque was erected by Roman Emperor Trajan to commemorate the completion of his military road along the Danube. It was declared a Monument of Culture of Exceptional Importance in 1979, and is protected by the Republic of Serbia.

The plaque and the accompanying Roman road were constructed between AD 98 and 100. At its peak, the road was a marvel of engineering, partially carved into the cliff faces and supported by a wooden scaffold over the water. The monument was relocated in 1972 when the Iron Gate I Hydroelectric Power Station was built, raising the water level of the Danube by about 35 meters.

== Inscription ==
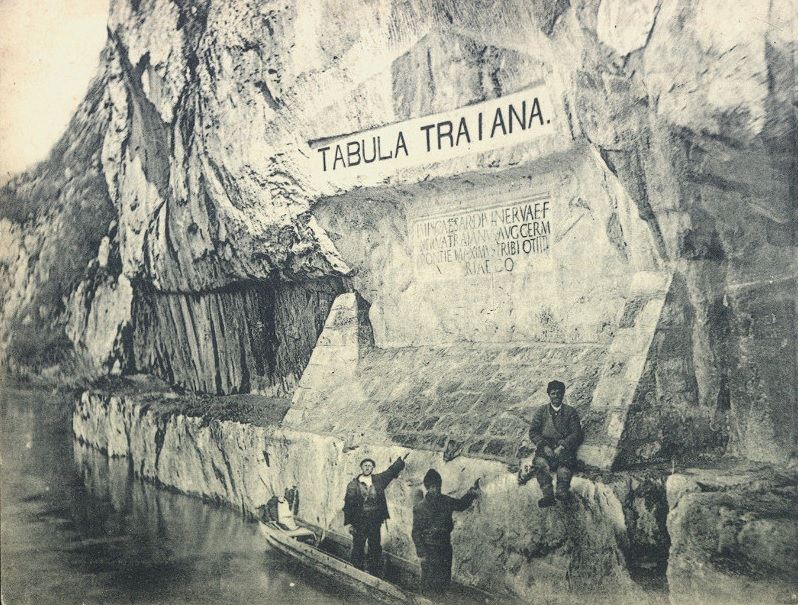
Tabula Traiana in the original location and the original Roman road, 1908

The plaque is a 4-meter wide and 1.75-meter high tablet, carved into the rock. It is decorated with two winged genii, two dolphins, and an eagle, and is inscribed with the following Latin text:

IMP. CAESAR. DIVI. NERVAE. F
NERVA TRAIANVS. AVG. GERM
PONTIF MAXIMVS TRIB POT IIII
PATER PATRIAE COS III
MONTIBVS EXCISI(s) ANCO(ni)BVS
SVBLAT(i)S VIA(m) F(ecit)

The text was interpreted by Otto Benndorf to mean:

Emperor Caesar son of the divine Nerva, Nerva Trajan, the Augustus, Germanicus, Pontifex Maximus, invested for the fourth time as Tribune, Father of the Fatherland, Consul for the third time, excavating mountain rocks and using wood beams has made this road.

== Relocation ==
When the plan for the hydro plant and its reservoir was made in 1965, it was clear that numerous historical remains along the banks would be affected. The Serbian Academy of Sciences and Arts urged for the plaque to be preserved, and the government accepted the motion. The task of relocating the monument was entrusted to the mining company "Venčac", whose experts had previously participated in the relocation of the Abu Simbel temples in Egypt.

Several ideas were considered, including building a caisson around the plaque, cutting it into smaller pieces, or lifting it with the floating elevator "Veli Jože". However, these were all discarded due to technical challenges or the risk of damaging the monument's authenticity.

The final decision was to carve a new indentation into the rock 22 meters above the plaque's original location. The plaque was then cut in one piece, along with parts of the surrounding rock and the original road. The 350-ton block was lifted to its new location using cable saws. The work began in September 1967 and was completed in 1969.

== See also ==
- Trajan's Bridge
- Trajan
- Iron Gates
- Danube Limes
