= Miroč =

Mountain in Serbia

- Location within Serbia

Highest point
- Elevation: 768 m (2,520 ft)
- Coordinates: 44°35′31″N 22°16′45″E

Geography
- Location: Eastern Serbia
- Parent range: Carpathian Mountains

Miroč (Serbian Cyrillic: Мироч) is a mountain in eastern Serbia, between the towns of Donji Milanovac and Tekija. Its highest peak Štrbac has an elevation of 768 meters (2,520 ft) above sea level. Along with Liškovac, it is part of the Iron Gate gorge of the Danube river. It is located in the Đerdap National Park.

In Serbian folklore, it is considered a mystical mountain with magic herbs to heal all wounds of haiduks, and the specific above of Vila Ravijojla (cf. the article on Vilas), the blood sister of Prince Marko. According to legend, after the Battle of Rovine (in which historical Marko Kraljević was killed), heavily wounded Marko swam across the Danube on his horse Šarac and reached the Koroglaš locality. Vila Ravijojla collected medicinal herbs from the Miroč mountain and treated his wounds. Koroglaš Monastery was built on the location in the 14th century.

The mountain is known for its quality honey. The surrounding area is rich in animal life, especially deer and wild boar, and there are protected hunting, like Vratna and Ploče.

The watershed of the Blederija river has been declared a natural monument in December 2019, due to the "richness and variety of geodiversity". It includes four springs which form the river, a natural reservoir in the lower section of the river valley, the Sokolovica spring cave, a small limestone gorge and the water cascades.

== See also ==
- List of mountains in Serbia
