= Tekija (Kladovo) =

Tekija Текија
- Village
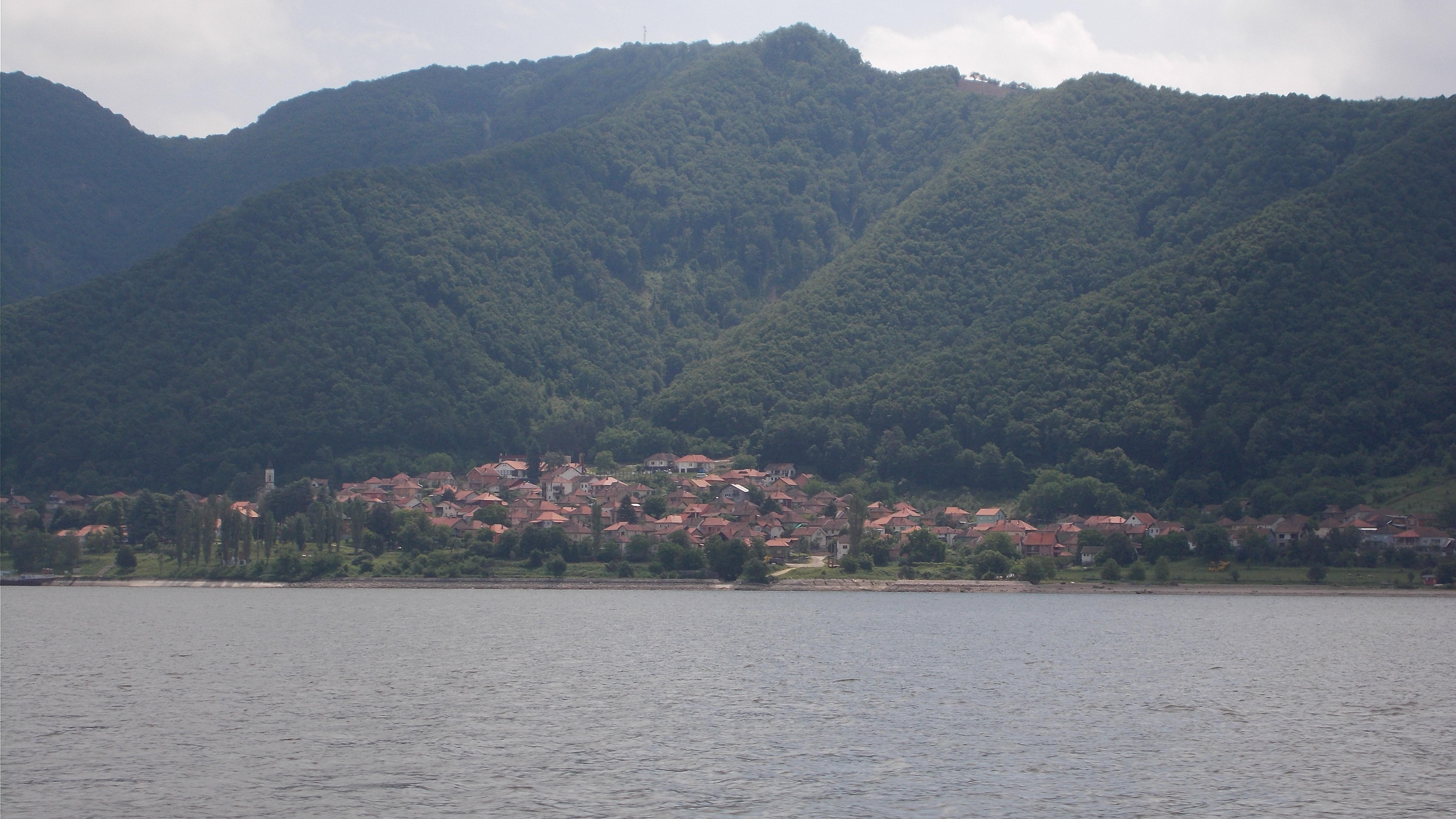
- Tekija (Kladovo)

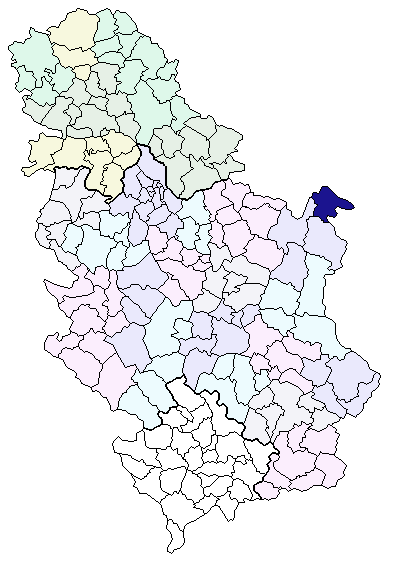
- Location of Kladovo Municipality in Serbia

- Location within Serbia
- Coordinates: 44°41′N 22°25′E
- Country: Serbia
- District: Bor District
- Municipality: Kladovo

Population (2002)
  - Total: 967
- Time zone: UTC+1 (CET)
  - Summer (DST): UTC+2 (CEST)

Tekija is a village in the municipality of Kladovo in eastern Serbia. According to the 2002 census, the village has a population of 967 people.

Tekija is an important strategic and tourist point on the Danube River. It lies in the Iron Gates gorge, below the Miroč mountain, overlooking the Romanian city of Orşova. Although the settlement is first mentioned in records from the First Serbian uprising, the current buildings originate from the 1960s. During the building of the Đerdap I hydroelectric dam, the original village was submerged and resettled to the current location. Along with the houses, the nearby island of Ada Kale, the last sanctuary of ethnic Turks from the region, sunk under the river.

Tekija lies at the heart of the Đerdap national park. It is a popular destination for fishermen. The traditional festival "Zlatna bućka", held annually at the end of August, attracts numerous fishermen and other tourists.

== Archaeology ==
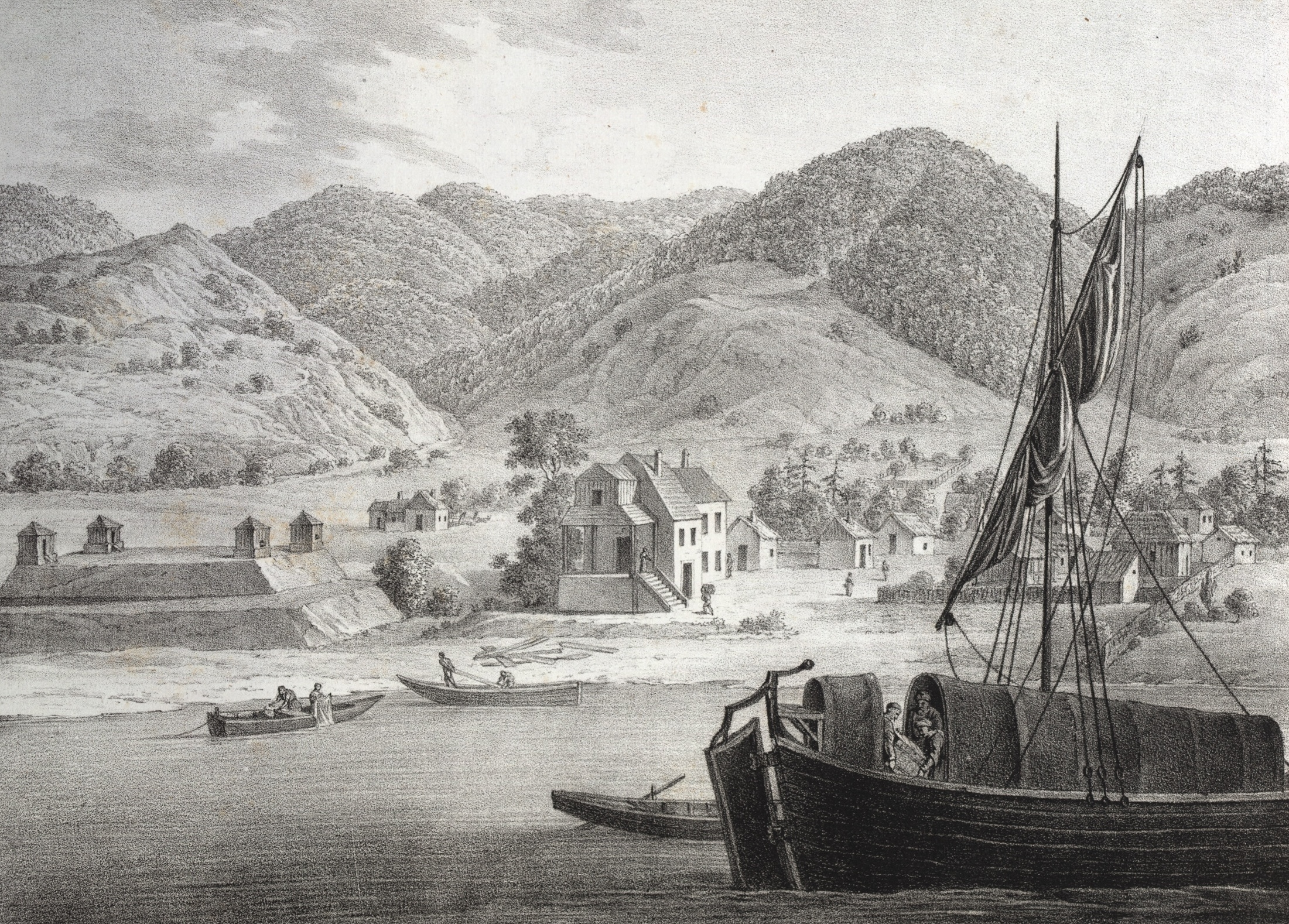
1826 lithograph of Tekija

Archaeological excavations in Tekija revealed a castle dating from the 3rd to 4th century and multiple civilian buildings from the 1st-4th centuries. These structures featured promenades, columned halls, paved floors, and fresco remains. Excavations also unearthed luxury ceramics and bronze items.

In Tekija, a significant archaeological find comprised a collection of silver and gold artifacts, including coins, jewelry, vessels, and plates adorned with depictions of deities. Among these items, a silver buckle inscribed with the name Gaius Valerius Cresces, identified as belonging to a Roman soldier of the centuria Veri, was discovered. This inscription suggests that he was likely the owner or had a significant connection to the hoard.
