= Mali Krš =

Mountain in Serbia

- Location within Serbia

Highest point
- Elevation: 929 m (3,048 ft)
- Coordinates: 44°17′08″N 22°00′58″E

Geography
- Location: Eastern Serbia
- Parent range: Carpathian Mountains

Mali Krš (Serbian Cyrillic: Мали Крш) is a mountain in eastern Serbia. Its highest peak, Garvan, has an elevation of 929 metres above sea level. While not particularly rugged, Mali Krš is remote, hidden between nearby mountains of Liškovac, Veliki Krš and Homolje Mountains. Like nearby Veliki Krš and Stol, Mali Krš is dominated by karst formations, and they are collectively known as "Gornjanski Kras". Mali Krš has an elongated karst ridge at the top section.

== See also ==
- List of mountains in Serbia
