= Liškovac =

Mountain in Serbia

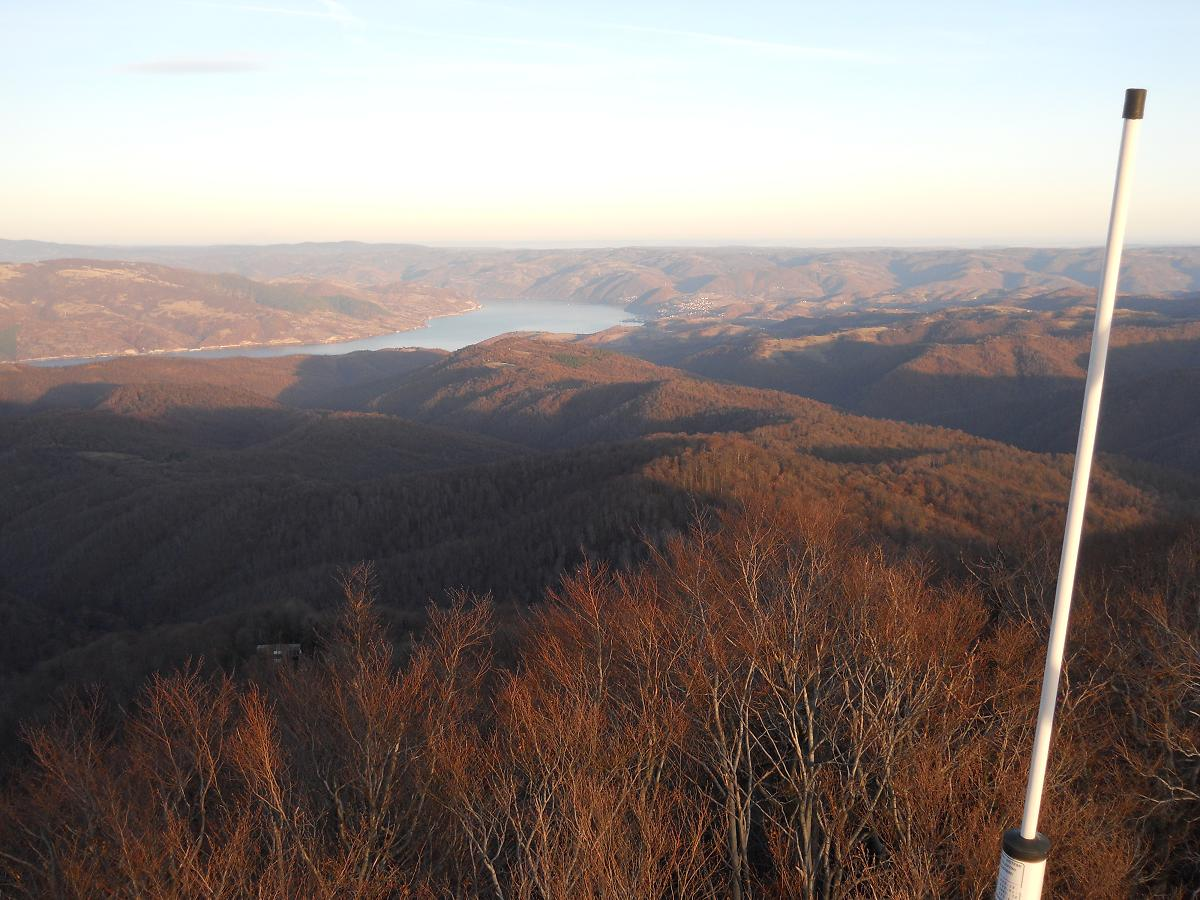

Highest point
- Elevation: 803 m (2,635 ft)
- Coordinates: 44°27′09″N 22°01′17″E

Geography
- Location within Serbia
- Location: Eastern Serbia
- Parent range: Carpathian Mountains

Liškovac (Serbian Cyrillic: Лишковац) is a mountain in eastern Serbia, between towns of Majdanpek and Donji Milanovac. Its highest peak, Veliki Liškovac, has an elevation of 803 meters above sea level. Along with Miroč, Liškovac is part of the Iron Gates of the Danube river. It is located in the Đerdap National Park.

== See also ==
- List of mountains in Serbia
