= Brza Palanka =

Brza Palanka Брза Паланка
- Town
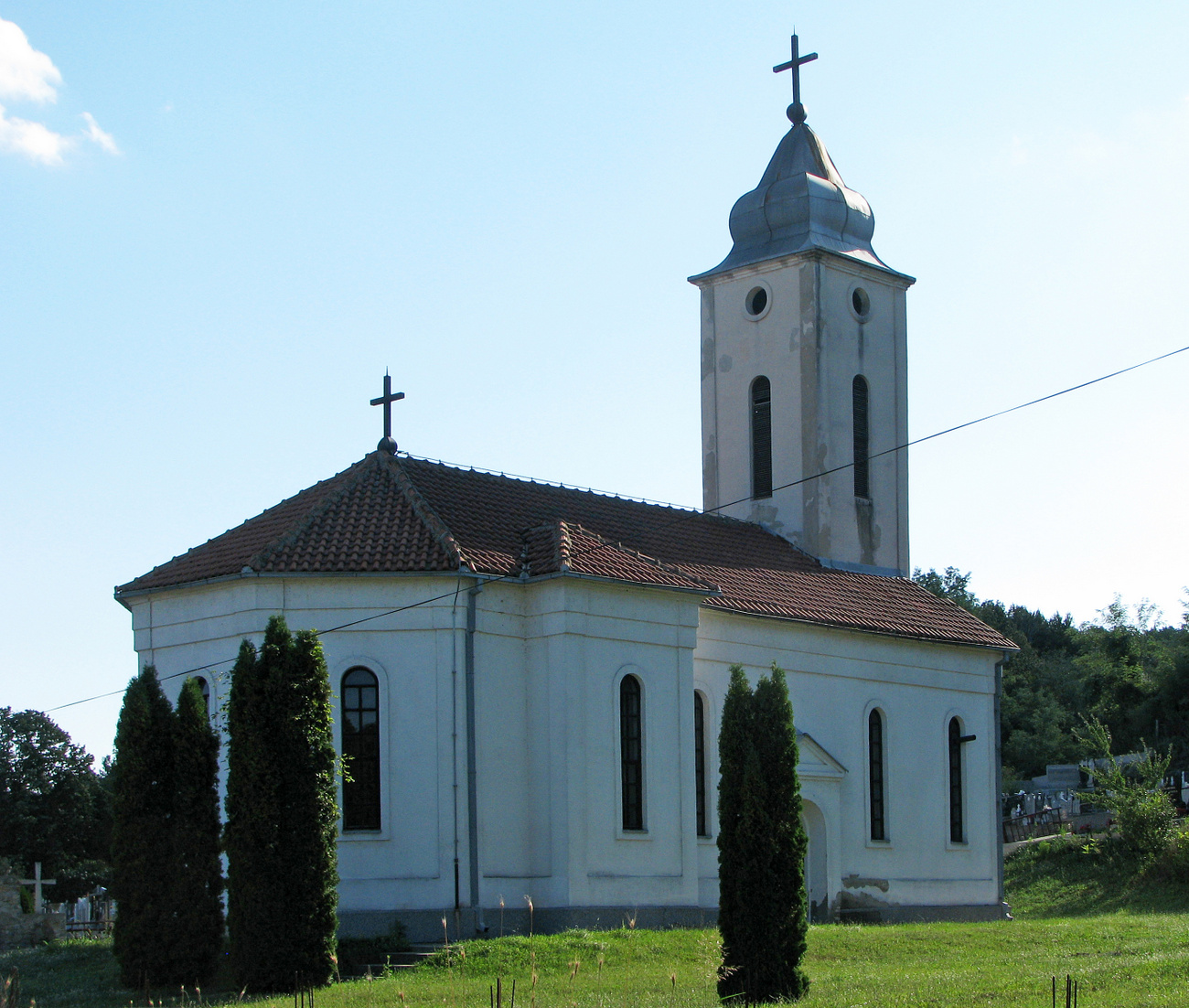
- Holy Trinity Church in Brza Palanka

- Location within Serbia
- Coordinates: 44°28′N 22°27′E
- Country: Serbia
- District: Bor District
- Municipality: Kladovo

Population (2011)
  - Total: 860
- Time zone: UTC+1 (CET)
  - Summer (DST): UTC+2 (CEST)
- Postal code: 19323
- Area code: 019
- Vehicle registration: KL

Brza Palanka (Serbian Cyrillic: Брза Паланка [br̩̂ːzaː pǎlaːŋka]) is a town in eastern Serbia, on the right bank of the Danube. It is situated in the Kladovo municipality, in the Bor District. The population of the town is 860 people (2011 census).

The town has its origin in the Roman town of Aegeta (Egeta).

== Archaeology ==
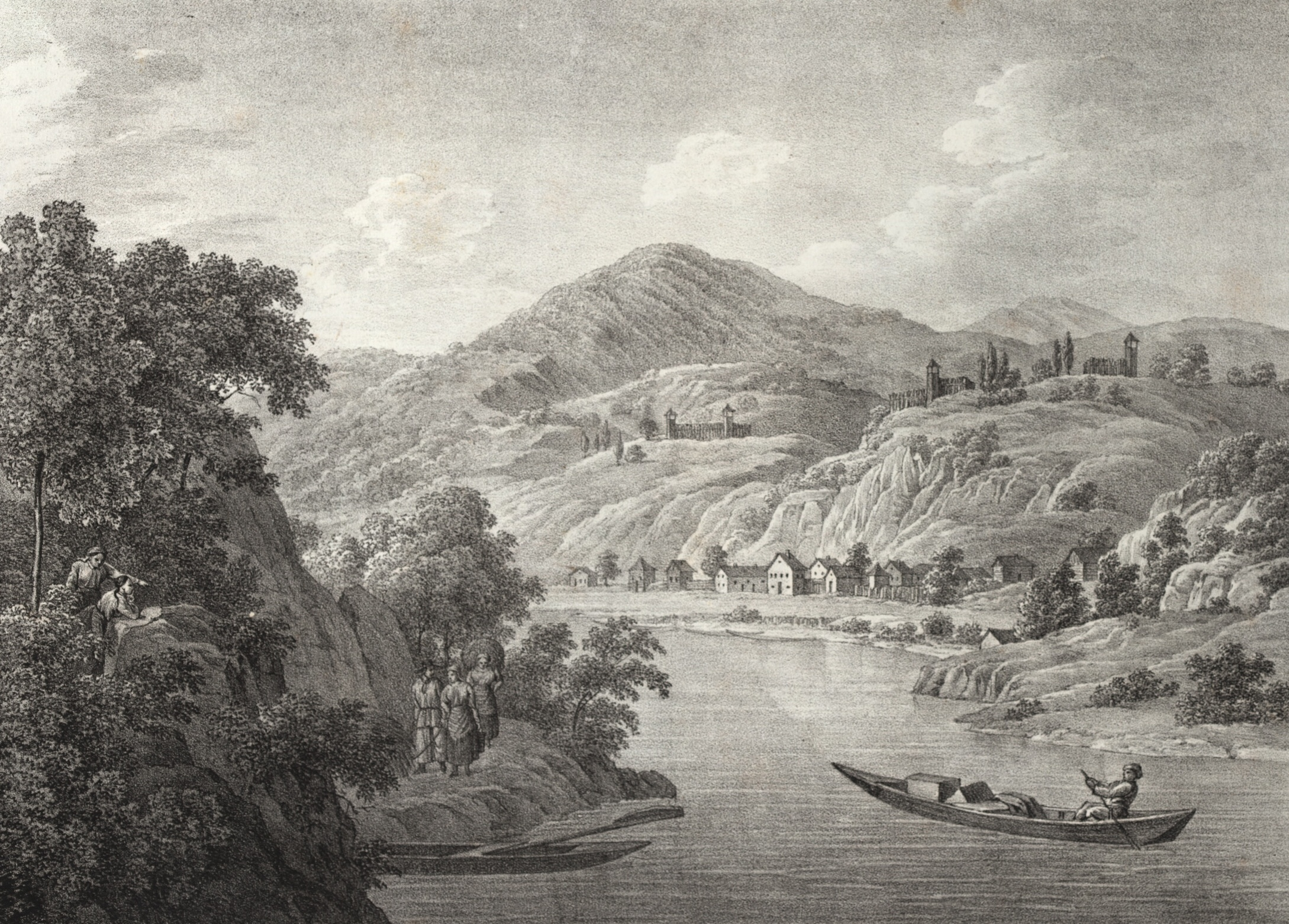
Brza Palanka in 1826

A sacracium of Jupiter Dolichenus was found here.

One notable finding from this site is a fragmented marble statue depicting Jupiter Dolichenus along with Juno Dolichena, with Jupiter standing on a bull and Juno on a hind, alongside the figure of Victoria. The composition, dating from the early 2nd to early 3rd century AD, showcases Jupiter in Roman military attire and Juno with a patera and sceptre, differing in style from other known depictions, such as the more static composition from Virinum in Noricum.
