= Donji Milanovac =

Town in Majdanpek, Serbia

Donji Milanovac Доњи Милановац
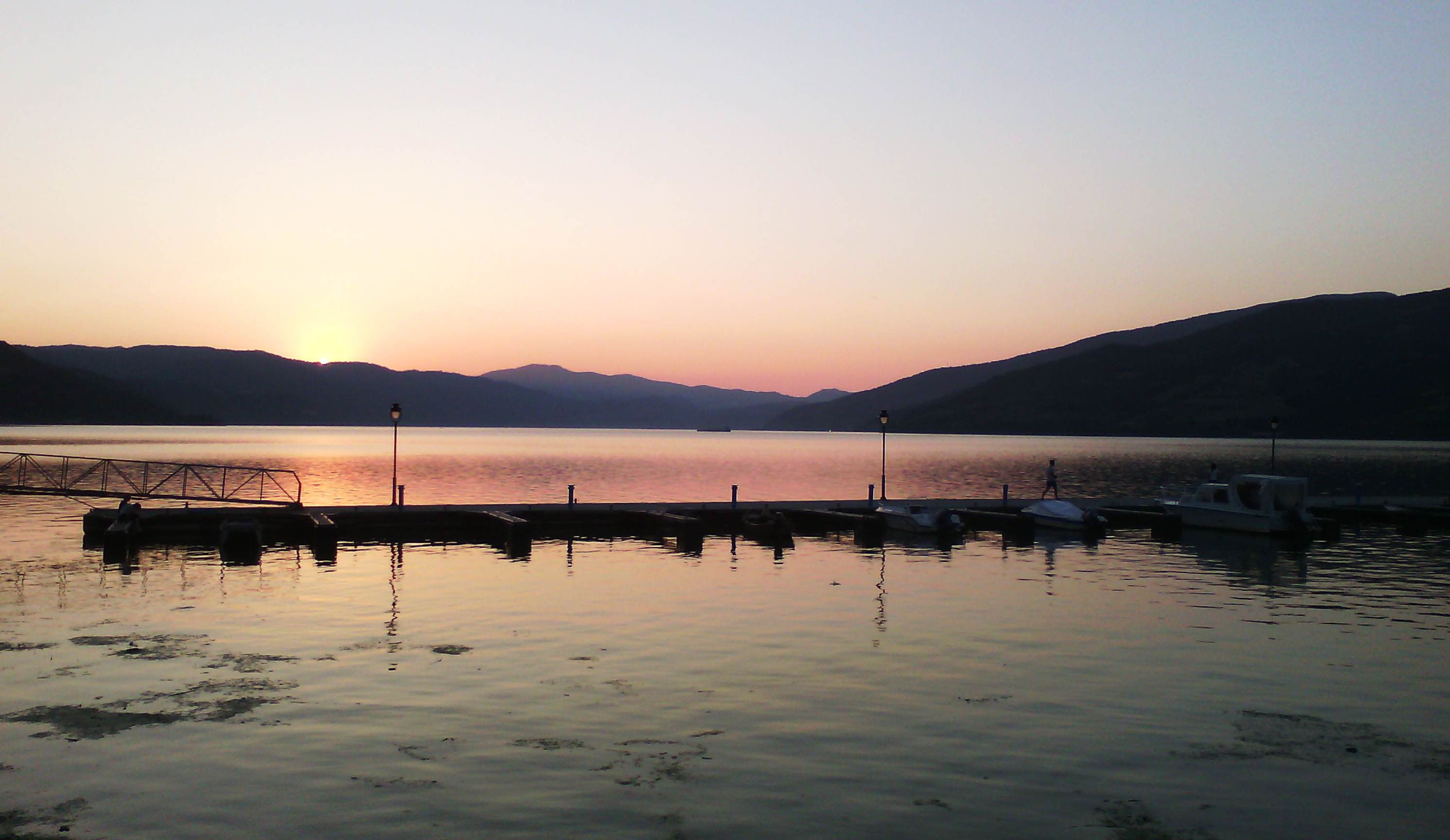
- Marina in Donji Milanovac during sunset

- Seal

- Location in Serbia
- Coordinates: 44°27′53″N 22°09′08″E
- Country: Serbia
- Municipality: Majdanpek
- District: Bor District
- Elevation: 56 m (184 ft)

Population (2011)
  - Total: 2,410
- Time zone: UTC+1 (Central European)
- Postal code: 19220
- Area code: +381 30
- Vehicle registration: BO

Donji Milanovac (Serbian Cyrillic: Доњи Милановац, pronounced [dɔ̂ːɲiː mǐlanɔvats]) is a town in eastern Serbia. It is situated in the Majdanpek municipality, in the Bor District. It is located on the right bank of Lake Đerdap on the Danube. The population of the town is 2,410 people (2011 census). Its name means "Lower Milanovac" (there is an Upper Milanovac, as well).

The management office of Đerdap national park is located in the town.

It has been nicknamed a "town of 100,000 roses".

== Geography ==
The town is located on the right bank of Lake Đerdap on the Danube in the Đerdap national park. The Miroč mountain lies between Donji Milanovac and Tekija and further to the south are the Kučaj mountains. The Miroč is known for the abundance of the medicinal herbs while the area surrounding the town is covered in lush deciduous forests.

Via Danube, Donji Milanovac is 198 km (123 mi) away from Belgrade. It is situated in the Veliki Kazan gorge, a section of the composite Iron Gate gorge. At Donji Milanovac, the Danube is 2,000 m (6,600 ft) wide, while at Veliki Kazan is 170 m (560 ft) wide and 90 m (300 ft) deep. The locality on which the settlement is today used to be called "Trkulja's gallery", after a local artist. A balloon station "Pena" was situated on location, as prior to the discovery of radio, balloons were used for signalization during the navigation through the canal.

Prior to the construction of the Iron Gate I Hydroelectric Power Station, which dammed the Danube and created the Lake Đerdap in 1967–72, belugas from the Black Sea reached the gorge, travelling upstream for 1,000 km (620 mi). Specimen, up to 300 kg (660 lb), used to be fished in Donji Milanovac. The dam prevents belugas from swimming upstream since, so the largest fish in the lake now is wels catfish, with rare specimen reaching 100 kg (220 lb).

== History ==
Donji Milanovac lies on remains of an 8000-year-old Mesolithic settlement of the Lepenski Vir, and of the ancient Roman town and castra of Taliata. Since the founding of the first settlement, Donji Milanovac was moved three times. It was originally established as a settlement called Banja which was moved some 10 km (6.2 mi) upstream, on the island of Poreč (which also became the name of the settlement), during the 17th century.

In 1830, due to frequent flooding, ruling prince Miloš Obrenović ordered the town be moved to the nearest, right bank, so it was resettled 2 km (1.2 mi) downstream, at the mouth of river Oreškovica into the Danube. It became the first town in Serbia built by architectural planning. The relocation was finished by 1832 and the town became the seat of the Poreč nahija.

From 1929 to 1941, Donji Milanovac was part of the Morava Banovina of the Kingdom of Yugoslavia.

After construction of the "Đerdap I" hydroelectric power station in 1970, the town was moved again to its present location, another 6 km (3.7 mi) downstream, and the old site was completely flooded by the Lake Đerdap in 1971.

== Lepenski Vir ==
Lepenski Vir is an important Mesolithic archaeological site located 15 kilometers from Donji Milanovac. The latest radiocarbon and AMS data suggests that the chronology of Lepenski Vir is compressed between 9500/7200-6000 BC. There is some disagreement about the early start of the settlement and culture of Lepenskir Vir. But the latest data suggest 9500-7200 to be the start. The late Lepenskir Vir (6300–6000 BC) architectural development was the development of the Trapezoidal buildings and monumental sculpture. The Lepenski Vir site consists of one large settlement with around ten satellite villages. Numerous piscine sculptures and peculiar architecture have been found at the site.

== Culture ==
The Church of St. Nicholas is located in the centre of Donji Milanovac. It was built in 1840 thanks to captain Miša Anastasijević. Captain Miša's konak and Tenka's house have been proclaimed cultural heritage of Serbia. There is a monument to the 1912–1918 wars (Balkan Wars, First World War), and a mammoth sculpture.

Another noted monument is the Roman Tabula Traiana.

== Economy ==
Until the 1990s, there were numerous companies in the town: wood company "Poreč", factories "FEP" and "Megaplast", hotel "Lepenski Vir", agricultural cooperative "Sloga", etc. By the 2010s, the majority of economy deteriorated and depopulation accelerated.

== Tourism ==
In 1972 a hotel "Lepenski Vir" was built and the town beach was arranged. The area became a popular camping location as, due to the climate, there are no mosquitos. Donji Milanovac and the gorge are situated on the European bicycle corridor and the Đerdap highway, the shortest connection between Belgrade and Bucharest, Romania, and further with the Black Sea. The town also has a pier, which is today mostly used by the foreign river cruisers. During the 1970s there was a regular motorboat line from Belgrade to Đerdap, which took about two and a half hours.

Donji Milanovac was nicknamed "Serbian Hollywood" as numerous movies were filmed in the town and the surroundings, including Naivko (1975), Ćao, inspektore (1984) and Vampiri su među nama (1989), and "Vanzemaljci su krivi za sve" (1991).

== Sport ==
FK Poreč is the local football club, founded in 1932.

== Notable people ==
- Ilija Zavišić (b. 1952), retired footballer
- Aleksandar Jovanović (1896—1977),
- Miša Anastasijević (1803—1885), businessman
- Tenka Stefanović (1797—1865), politician
- Starina Novak (ca. 1530—1601), guerrilla and military commander
- Dragos Ristić (1933—2020), economist

== Gallery ==
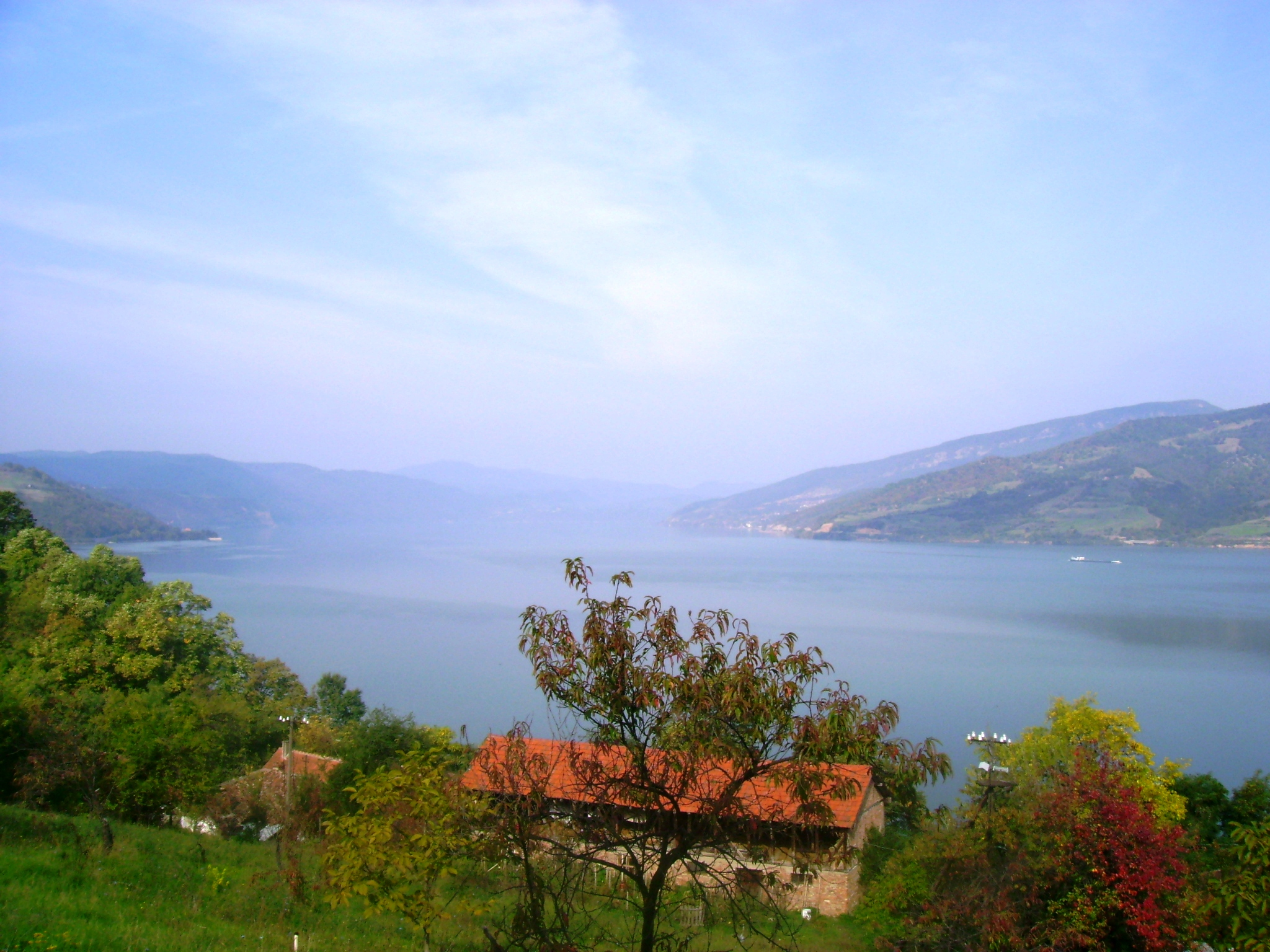
Panoramic View
