= Veliki Krš =

Mountain in Serbia

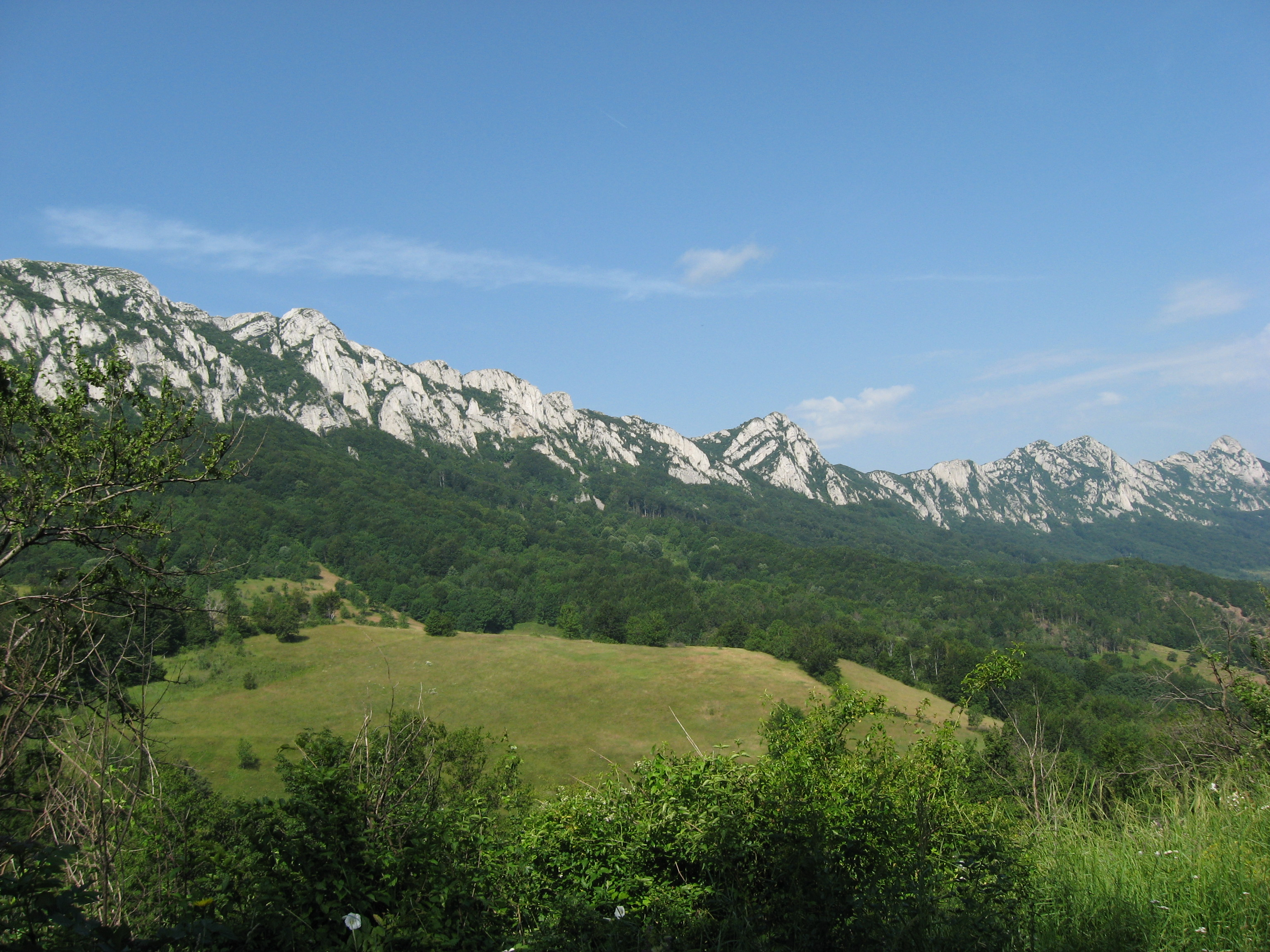

Highest point
- Elevation: 1,148 m (3,766 ft)
- Coordinates: 44°10′15″N 22°05′16″E

Geography
- Location within Serbia
- Location: Eastern Serbia
- Parent range: Carpathian Mountains

Veliki Krš (Serbian Cyrillic: Велики Крш) is a mountain in eastern Serbia, near the town of Bor. Its highest peak, Veliki Krš, has an elevation of 1,148 meters above sea level. Like nearby Mali Krš and Stol, it is dominated by karst formations, and they are collectively known as "Gornjanski Kras". Veliki Krš has an elongated karst ridge at the top section.

== See also ==
- List of mountains in Serbia
