= Deli Jovan =

Mountain in Serbia

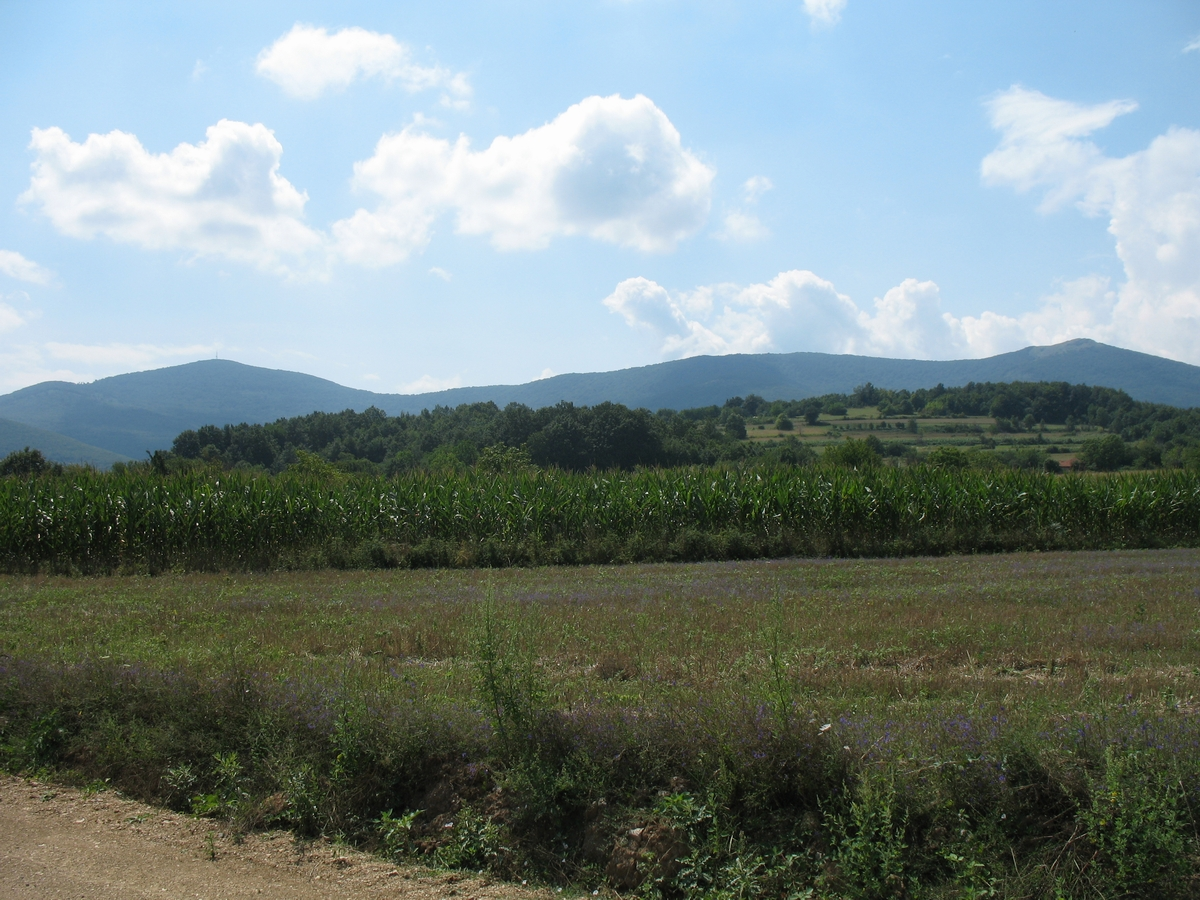

Highest point
- Elevation: 1,141 m (3,743 ft)
- Coordinates: 44°13′15″N 22°13′02″E

Geography
- Location within Serbia
- Location: Eastern Serbia
- Parent range: Carpathian Mountains

Deli Jovan (Serbian Cyrillic: Дели Јован, pronounced [dɛ̌li jɔ̌v̞an]) is a mountain in eastern Serbia, near the town of Negotin. Its highest peak Crni vrh has an elevation of 1,141 m (3,743 ft) above sea level. On the top of the mountain, there is a television and radio transmission tower.

== See also ==
- List of mountains in Serbia
