= Chief of the General Staff (Serbia and Montenegro) =

Head of military staff of Serbia and Montenegro

- Начелник Генералштаба (Serbo-Croatian); Načelnik Generalštaba (Serbo-Croatian)
- Standard of the Chief of the General Staff (1995–2003)

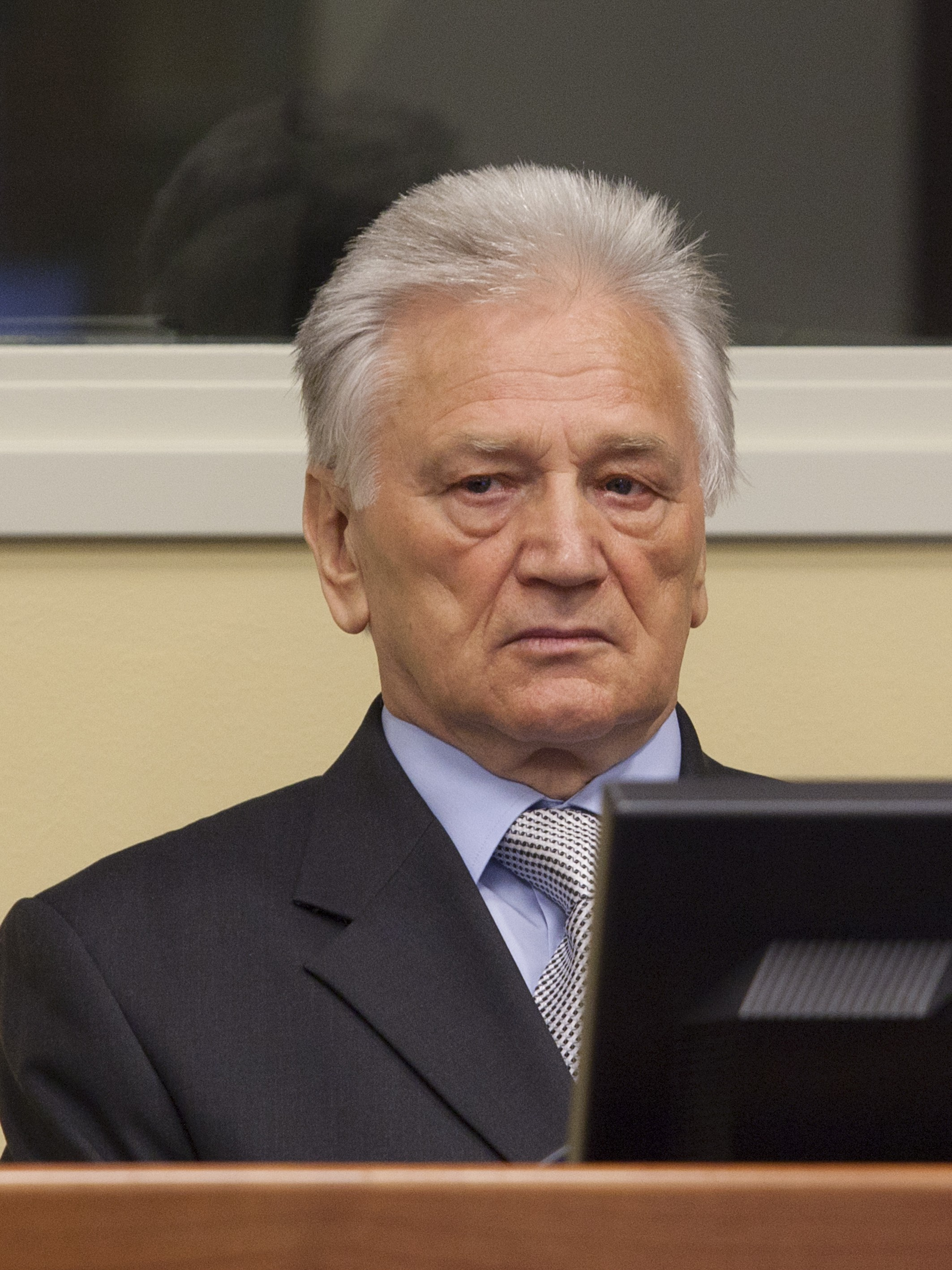
- Longest in office Colonel general Momčilo Perišić; 26 August 1993 – 26 November 1998
- Armed Forces of Serbia and Montenegro
- Type: Chief of staff
- Status: Abolished
- Abbreviation: NGŠ
- Member of: General Staff
- Reports to: Minister of Defence (Serbia and Montenegro)
- Seat: General Staff Building, Belgrade (1992–99)
- Appointer: President of Serbia and Montenegro (1992–2006)
- Term length: No fixed length
- Precursor: Chief of the General Staff (Yugoslavia)
- Formation: 20 May 1992; 34 years ago
- First holder: Colonel general Života Panić
- Final holder: Lt. Col. General Ljubiša Jokić
- Abolished: 3 June 2006; 20 years ago
- Superseded by: Chief of the General Staff (Montenegro) Chief of the General Staff (Serbia)
- Deputy: Deputy Chief of the General Staff

The Chief of the General Staff (Serbo-Croatian: Начелник Генералштаба / Načelnik Generalštaba) was the chief of the General Staff of the Armed Forces of Serbia and Montenegro (officially named the Armed Forces of Yugoslavia between 1992 and 2003) from 1992 to 2006.

== List of chiefs of the general staff ==
Following the breakup of Yugoslavia and the secession of four out of six constituent republic in the SFR Yugoslavia the remaining two (Serbia and Montenegro) established a federation in 1992 called the Federal Republic of Yugoslavia (FR Yugoslavia). This lasted until 2003 when it was reconstituted as a state union called Serbia and Montenegro. In 2006 both countries declared independence and parted ways.

No.	Portrait	Chief of the General Staff	Took office	Left office	Time in office	Defence branch
1	Života Panić	Colonel general Života Panić (1933–2003) (Note: Chief of the General Staff of the Yugoslav People's Army until 20 May 1992.)	20 May 1992	26 August 1993	1 year, 98 days	Ground Forces
2	Momčilo Perišić	Colonel general Momčilo Perišić (born 1944)	26 August 1993	26 November 1998	5 years, 92 days	Ground Forces
3	Dragoljub Ojdanić	General of the Army; Dragoljub Ojdanić (1941–2020) (Note: Afterwards served as the Minister of Defence in 2000.)	26 November 1998	7 February 2000	1 year, 73 days	Ground Forces
4	Nebojša Pavković	Colonel general Nebojša Pavković (1946–2025)	7 February 2000	24 June 2002	2 years, 137 days	Ground Forces
5	Branko Krga	Colonel general Branko Krga (born 1945) (Note: Chief of the General Staff of the Armed Forces of Serbia and Montenegro since 7 March 2003.)	24 June 2002	23 December 2004	2 years, 182 days	Ground Forces
6	Dragan Paskaš	Lt. Col. General; Dragan Paskaš (born 1951)	23 December 2004	6 October 2005	287 days	Ground Forces
7	Ljubiša Jokić	Lt. Col. General; Ljubiša Jokić (born 1958)	6 October 2005	3 June 2006	240 days	Air Force

== See also ==
- Chief of the General Staff (Yugoslavia)
- Chief of the General Staff (Montenegro)
- Chief of the Serbian General Staff
- Commander of Kosovo Security Force

== Sources ==
- Chief of the General Staff: 1876–2000, Ivetić Velimir, Belgrade 2000.
