= Jovan Lakčević =

Montenegrin general

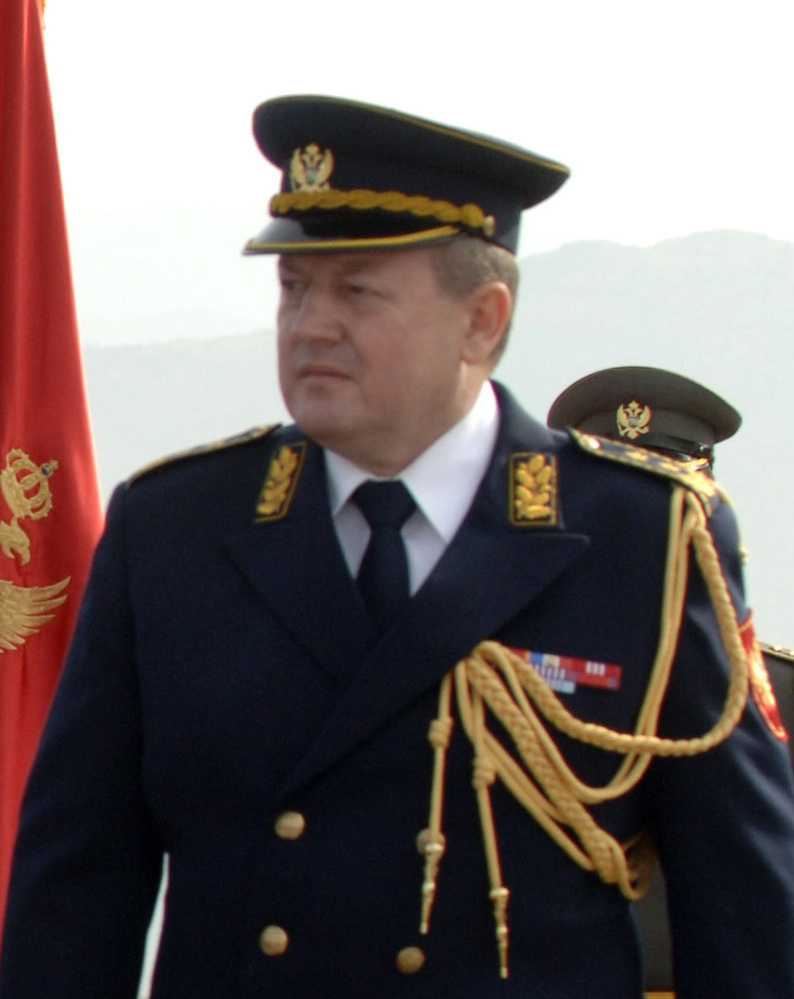
Lakcevic in September 2006.

Lieutenant General Jovan Lakčević (Serbian Cyrillic: Јован Лакчевић; born 1955) was a Montenegrin Ground Army officer who was the first Chief of the General Staff of the Armed Forces of Montenegro from 2006 to 2008.

== Military career ==
During his service in the Armed Forces of Serbia and Montenegro, Lakčević attained the rank of Lieutenant Colonel General and served as the commander of the Podgorica Corps.

Following the end of the union with Serbia in June 2006, the Defense and Security Council of Montenegro officially appointed Lakčević as the first Chief of the General Staff on 9 June 2006. During his tenure, he oversaw the transition from conscription to a professional force. He served as Chief of the General Staff until 6 February 2008, when the Defense and Security Council accepted his request for retirement. He was succeeded by Vice Admiral Dragan Samardžić. He was then made Military Attaché of Montenegro to Slovenia, serving until April 2011.
