= Zoran Lazarević (general) =

Montenegrin general (born 1967)

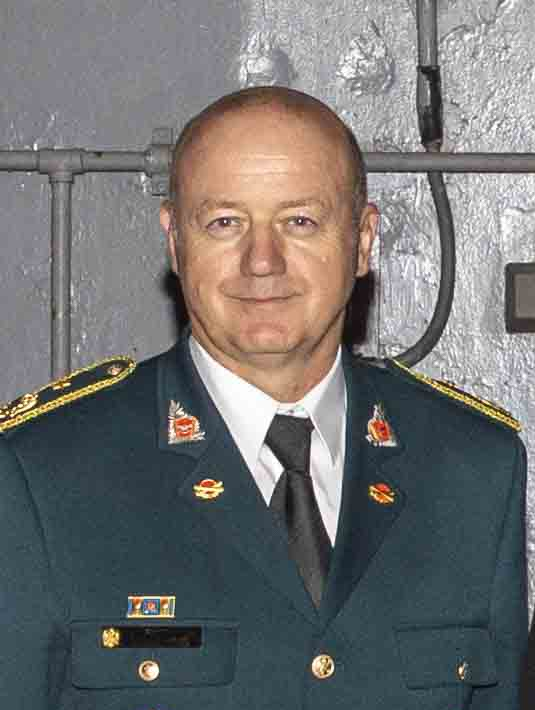
Brigadier General Zoran Lazarević in 2023.

Zoran Lazarević (Cyrillic: Зоран Лазаревић; born 4 December 1967) is a Montenegrin brigadier general and the Chief of the General Staff of the Armed Forces of Montenegro from 2022 to 2025.

== Early life and career ==
He was born on December 4, 1967, in Šavnik and completed elementary school in Šavnik in 1982 and Military High School in Belgrade, SR Serbia, in 1986. He graduated from the Military Academy in Belgrade and Zadar in 1990, majoring in artillery. He completed Command and Staff and General Staff training in Belgrade in 2002 and 2009, respectively. He began his military service in Sombor, as the commander of an artillery platoon, and continued as the commander of an artillery battery in Bačka Topola and Ruma.

In February 1996, he returned to Montenegro, to the position of commander of an artillery battery in the 326th Mixed Artillery Brigade of the Podgorica Corps. He continued his career advancement, guided by command, as deputy commander of the 130 mm artillery division and commander of the 128 mm multiple rocket launcher division. After completing the Command and Staff Training, he served as the Chief of the Operations and Training Department in the 326th Mixed Artillery Brigade of the Podgorica Corps, after which, as required by the service, he was transferred to a higher position, Chief of Staff of the Fifth Motorized Brigade Command of the Podgorica Corps, where he performed the duties of deputy commander and acted as commander of the Fifth Motorized Brigade.

== Montenegrin military ==
After the formation of the Armed Forces of Montenegro, he was appointed Deputy Commander of the Special Operations Brigade, where he spent two years. He was appointed to the position of Head of the Department for Operational Affairs and Training of the General Staff from July 2009, and from July 2010 to the position of Deputy Chief of the General Staff. In May 2016, he continued his career at the Military Representation of Montenegro to NATO and the European Union, where he held the positions of Deputy Military Representative and Advisor to the Military Representative.

He was appointed Chief of the General Staff on 10 June 2022. In August 2024, President Jakov Milatović rejected the proposal of the Minister of Defense Dragan Krapović to relieve Lazarević of the post of Chief of the General Staff early. He was replaced on 3 June 2025, being replaced by Miodrag Vuksanović.

== Personal life ==
His hobbies include mountaineering, cycling and hunting. He is one of the founders of the Military Mountaineering Club "Captain". Lazarevic speaks English and Russian.

== Awards ==
- Order for Contribution to Security
