= Dragan Paskaš =

Serbian military officer

General Dragan Paskaš
- Serbian Cyrillic: Драган Паскаш
- Born: 4 April 1951 (age 75); Bački Gračac (Odžaci), SR Serbia, SFR Yugoslavia
- Military career
- Allegiance: Yugoslavia; Serbia and Montenegro
- Branch: Yugoslav People's Army; Armed Forces of Serbia and Montenegro
- Service years: ?–2005
- Rank: Lieutenant general
- Units: Yugoslav Ground Forces; Ground Forces of Serbia and Montenegro
- Commands: Chief of the General Staff
- Conflicts: Kosovo War

Dragan Paskaš (Serbian Cyrillic: Драган Паскаш; born 4 April 1951) is a retired Serbian military officer, who served as the Chief of the General Staff of the Armed Forces of Serbia and Montenegro from 23 December 2004 to 6 October 2005.

Military offices
Preceded by Branko Krga	Chief of the General Staff of the Armed Forces of Serbia and Montenegro; 23 December 2004 – 6 October 2005	Succeeded by Ljubiša Jokić
