= Momčilo Perišić =

Serbian former general (born 1944)

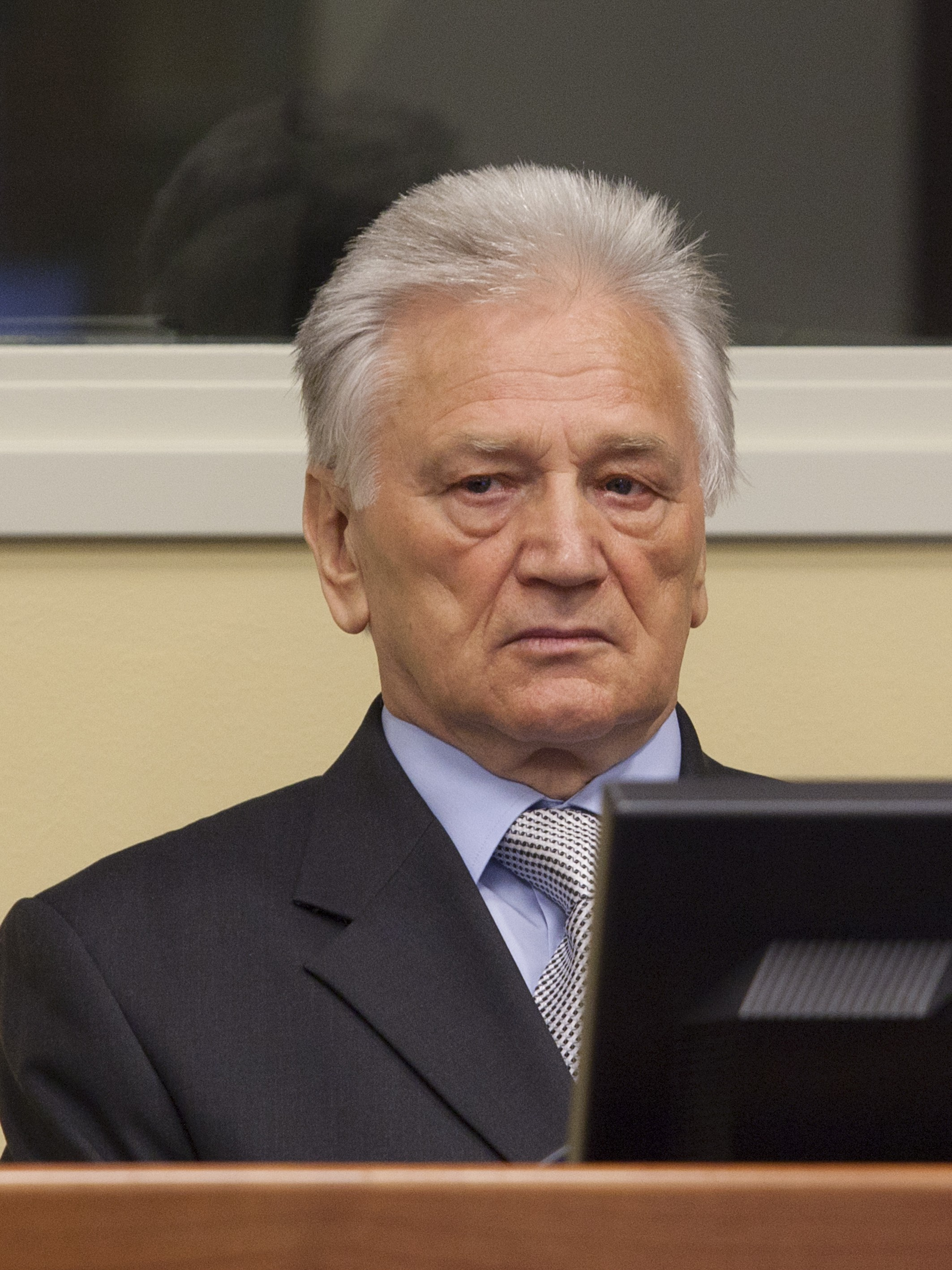
- Perišić in 2011
- Born: 22 May 1944 (age 81); Koštunići, German-occupied Serbia
- Allegiance: SFR Yugoslavia (1966–1992); FR Yugoslavia (1992–1998)
- Branch: Yugoslav People's Army (1966–1992); Yugoslav Army (1992–1998)
- Service years: 1966–1998
- Rank: Colonel General
- Conflicts: Croatian War of Independence; Bosnian War

Momčilo Perišić (Serbian Cyrillic: Момчило Перишић; born 22 May 1944) is a Serbian former general and politician who served as the Chief of the General Staff of the Armed Forces of Yugoslavia between 1993 and 1998.

On 6 September 2011, in a first-instance verdict, Perišić was found guilty of war crimes and crimes against humanity for his role in the Yugoslav Wars and sentenced to 27 years of imprisonment. On 28 February 2013, the Appeals Chamber reversed this decision and acquitted him on all counts. In 2021, the Belgrade Higher Court sentenced Perišić to three years' imprisonment for passing state secrets to the United States in 2002. On appeal, his sentence was increased to four years imprisonment.

== Military career ==
He joined the Yugoslav People's Army (JNA) and graduated from the military academy in 1966. When the conflict in the former Yugoslavia began, Perišić was the commander of the Artillery School Centre in Zadar.

In January 1992, Perišić was appointed commander of the newly established 13th Corps in the Bileća. In June 1992, he was appointed Chief of Staff and deputy commander of the 3rd Army, based in Niš. He became its Commander in April 1993. A Croatian court sentenced him to 20 years in prison in absentia for shelling the city of Zadar, but he was never arrested.

== Trial ==
In one of its last indictments, the International Criminal Tribunal for the former Yugoslavia (ICTY) indicted Perišić in February 2005. According to the indictment, he was "exercising his authority, pursuant to the policies and limitations set by the Supreme Defence Council, to provide substantial military assistance to the Armies of Republika Srpska and Republic of Serbian Krajina, which he knew was used, in significant part, in the commission of the crimes".

Perišić surrendered three months later, in May 2005, to face the charges. He was indicted for murder, inhumane acts, persecutions on political, racial or religious grounds, extermination, attacks on civilians for failing to stop his subordinates of committing the siege of Sarajevo, Zagreb rocket attack and Srebrenica massacre.

The trial ended in March 2011. The prosecutor alleged that crimes were committed by the VJ soldiers who had been transferred to the VRS and the SVK through the 30th and 40th Personnel Centers of the VJ General Staff. Perišić's command position, his ability to issue and implement orders, to discipline those who committed crimes and to promote and discharge soldiers showed that he had effective control, the prosecutor argued. The prosecutor sought life in prison for Perišić, while the defense argued that he should be acquitted of all charges.

On 6 September 2011, the court convicted Perišić of war crimes and crimes against humanity, and sentenced him to 27 years in prison. The judges ruled that he did not have effective control over Ratko Mladić and the VRS, but that he did have control over the SVK and failed to punish those responsible for the shelling of Zagreb. On 28 February 2013, the Appeals Chamber acquitted him of all charges. The judges concluded that the military assistance which the Yugoslav Army provided to Bosnian Serb and Bosnian Croat militias was intended to support their general war efforts rather than facilitate war crimes.

In 2021, the Belgrade Higher Court sentenced Perišić to three years' imprisonment for passing state secrets to the US in 2002. On appeal, his sentence was increased to four years.

Military offices
Preceded by Života Panić	Chief of the General Staff of the Armed Forces of Yugoslavia; 26 August 1993 – 26 November 1998	Succeeded by Dragoljub Ojdanić
