= Milutin Đurović =

Milutin Đurović (Cyrillic: Милутин Ђуровић; born 29 January 1974) is a Montenegrin brigadier general and the Chief of the General Staff of the Armed Forces of Montenegro from 16 April 2021 - 10 June 2022.
