= Dragoljub Ojdanić =

Serbian general (1941–2020)

- Born: 1 June 1941; Ravni, Užice, German-occupied Serbia
- Died: 6 September 2020 (aged 79); Belgrade, Serbia
- Military career
- Allegiance: SFR Yugoslavia (1964–1992); FR Yugoslavia (1992–2000)
- Branch: Yugoslav People's Army (1964–1992); Yugoslav Army (1992–2000)
- Service years: 1964–2000
- Rank: General of the Army
- Conflicts: Yugoslav Wars; Bosnian War; Kosovo War
- Awards: Order of Freedom

Dragoljub Ojdanić (Serbian Cyrillic: Драгољуб Ојданић; 1 June 1941 – 6 September 2020) was a Serbian General of the army who served as the Chief of the General Staff of the Armed Forces of FR Yugoslavia and Minister of Defence of FR Yugoslavia. Ojdanić commanded the Uzice corps during the Bosnian War and was tried and convicted of the deportation and forcible transfer of Kosovar Albanians during the Kosovo War by the ICTY.

== Education and career ==
In 1958, Ojdanić studied at the Yugoslav Military Academy and graduated in 1964. He was deputy commander of the 37th Corps, with command in Užice. He was promoted to Major General on 20 April 1992 and he became the commander of Užice korpus. Under his command, the Užice Corps was deployed in military operations in eastern Bosnia during the war in Bosnia and Herzegovina.

He served as Chief of the General Staff First Army of FRY in 1993 and 1994. From 1994 to 1996, he was commander of the First Army. In 1996 he became deputy commander Chief of the General Staff. In 1998 Slobodan Milošević placed Ojdanić as a Chief of the General Staff of the Yugoslav Army. He was also a Chief of General Staff during NATO's Operation Allied Force. In February 2000 after the death of defence minister Pavle Bulatović, he was made defence minister of Yugoslavia.

== ICTY trial and sentence ==
On 25 April 2002, Ojdanić was transferred by the Yugoslav government to the International Criminal Tribunal for the Former Yugoslavia (ICTY) in The Hague. Ojdanić was allowed to attend Milošević's funeral in March 2006. On 26 February 2009, the ICTY sentenced Ojdanić to 15 years in prison, following a conviction for deportation and forcible transfers of Kosovo Albanians.

On 27 May 2009, Ojdanić's case was appealed. Ojdanić's co-counsel on appeal was Peter Robinson of the United States. In January 2013, Ojdanić, publicly admitted his participation in war crimes against Kosovo Albanians and withdrew the appeal against his conviction. On 29 August 2013, Ojdanić was granted early release and afterwards lived in Serbia.

Military offices
Preceded by Momčilo Perišić	Chief of the General Staff of the Armed Forces of Yugoslavia; 26 November 1998 – 7 February 2000	Succeeded by Nebojša Pavković
Political offices
Preceded by Pavle Bulatović	Minister of Defence of the Federal Republic of Yugoslavia; 15 February – 4 November 2000	Succeeded by Slobodan Krapović
