= Života Panić =

Yugoslav general (1933–2003)

- Born: 3 November 1933; Gornja Crnišava, Yugoslavia (modern Serbia)
- Died: 19 November 2003 (aged 70); Belgrade, Serbia and Montenegro (modern Serbia)
- Military career
- Allegiance: SFR Yugoslavia; FR Yugoslavia
- Branch: Yugoslav People's Army (to 1992); Yugoslav Army (to 1993)
- Service years: 1952–1993
- Rank: Colonel General
- Conflicts: Yugoslav wars

Života Panić (Serbian Cyrillic: Живота Панић; 3 November 1933 – 19 November 2003) was a Yugoslav military officer who served as the last acting Minister of Defense of Yugoslavia and the Chief of the General Staff during the breakup of Yugoslavia.

== Biography ==
Panić, who held the rank of General, was in charge of the Yugoslav People's Army after the resignation of General Blagoje Adžić in 1992. Panić was in office from 1992 until 1993 (in the Federal Republic of Yugoslavia) through the dissolution of the Socialist Federal Republic of Yugoslavia. In 1993, he was dismissed from his post for scandals relating to his son, Goran, who was supplying the army at supposed inflated prices.

Panić graduated from Yugoslavian military school as a tank commander and gradually rose through the ranks of the Yugoslav People's Army through the 1970s and 1980s. He was given authority over the 1st Army District (Belgrade) and was the senior officer in charge of the units which fought in the battle of Vukovar. With the dissolution of Yugoslavia, on 27 April 1992 Panić was offered a position of chief of staff in the new Yugoslav Army. Panić began to re-align the Yugoslav army in 1993 with new battle-plans and strategies, but was not prepared for the political power struggles that were occurring in Belgrade at the time and retired.

Panić died in Belgrade on 19 November 2003, shortly after his 70th birthday.

Military offices
Preceded by Blagoje Adžić	Chief of the General Staff of the Armed Forces of Socialist Federal Republic of Yugoslavia; 27 February – 20 May 1992	Succeeded by Himself as Chief of the General Staff of the Armed Forces of Yugoslavia
Preceded by Himself as Chief of the General Staff of the Armed Forces of Socialist Federal Republic of Yugoslavia	Chief of the General Staff of the Armed Forces of Yugoslavia; 20 May 1992 – 26 August 1993	Succeeded by Momčilo Perišić
Political offices
Preceded by Blagoje Adžić; Acting	Federal Secretary of People's Defence of Yugoslavia; Acting; 27 February – 20 May 1992	Succeeded by Position abolished
