= Zoran Lazarević =

Zoran Lazarević may refer to:

- Zoran Lazarević (basketball player), Serbian basketball player
- Zoran Lazarević (general) (born 1967), Montenegrin general
- Zoran Lazarević (Uncharted), a character in the video game Uncharted 2: Among Thieves
