= Chief of the General Staff (Montenegro) =

- Начелник Генералштаба (Montenegrin)
- Logo of the Armed Forces of Montenegro

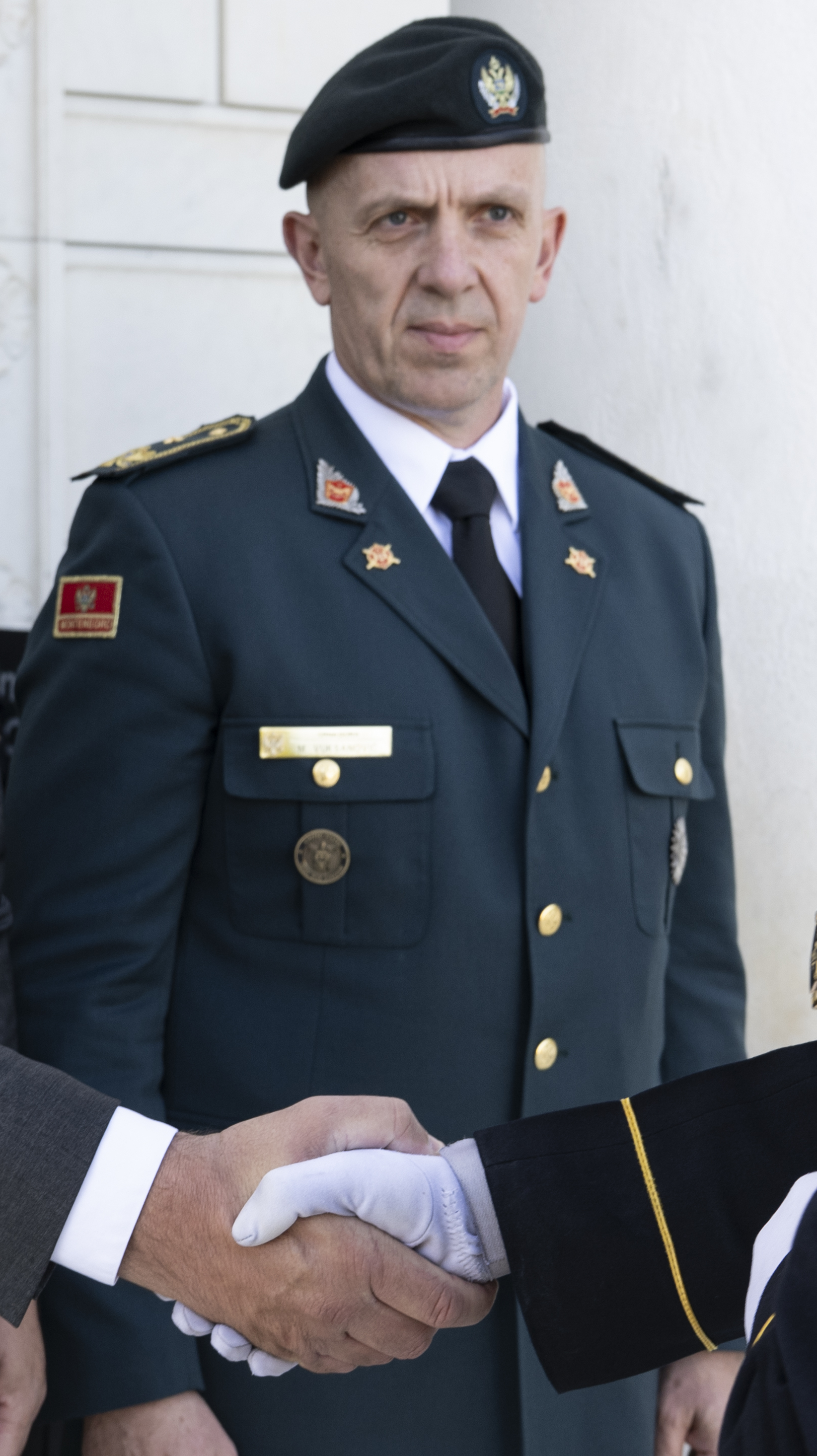
- Incumbent; Brigadier General Miodrag Vuksanović since 3 June 2025
- Ministry of Defence
- Member of: General Staff; Defense and Security Council
- Reports to: Minister of Defence
- Appointer: King of Montenegro (historical) President of Montenegro (modern)
- Formation: 6 August 1914 (historical); 9 June 2006 (modern)
- First holder: General Janko Vukotić (historical); Lt. Col. General Jovan Lakčević (modern)
- Deputy: Deputy chief of the general staff

The Chief of the General Staff (Montenegrin: Начелник Генералштаба, romanized: Načelnik Generalštaba) is the chief of the General Staff and Armed Forces of Montenegro. The chief of staff is appointed by the President of Montenegro, who is the commander-in-chief. The position dates back to the Principality of Montenegro. The current Chief of the General Staff is Brigadier general Miodrag Vuksanović.

== Kingdom of Montenegro (1910–1918) ==
No.	Portrait	Name (Birth–Death)	Term of office			Defence branch	Ref.
No.	Portrait	Name (Birth–Death)	Took office	Left office	Time in office	Defence branch	Ref.
1	Janko Vukotić	General; Janko Vukotić (1866–1927)	6 August 1914	16 January 1916	1 year, 163 days	Royal Montenegrin Army	–

For period from 1918 to 2006, see Chief of the General Staff of Yugoslavia and Chief of the General Staff of Serbia and Montenegro.

== Montenegro (2006–present) ==
No.	Portrait	Name (Birth–Death)	Term of office			Defence branch	Ref.
No.	Portrait	Name (Birth–Death)	Took office	Left office	Time in office	Defence branch	Ref.
1	Jovan Lakčević	Lt. Col. General; Jovan Lakčević (born 1955)	9 June 2006	6 February 2008	1 year, 242 days	Montenegrin Ground Army	–
2	Dragan Samardžić	Admiral; Dragan Samardžić (born 1963) (Note: In the beginning, served as Acting Chief of the General Staff.)	6 February 2008	13 January 2017	8 years, 342 days	Montenegrin Navy	–
3	Ljubiša Jokić	Colonel general Ljubiša Jokić (born 1958)	13 January 2017	17 October 2017	277 days	Montenegrin Air Force	–
–	Ilija Daković	Brigadier general Ilija Daković (born 1972); Acting	17 October 2017	12 July 2018	268 days	Montenegrin Ground Army	–
4	Dragutin Dakić	Brigadier general Dragutin Dakić (born 1968)	12 July 2018	16 April 2021	2 years, 278 days	Montenegrin Ground Army	
5	Milutin Đurović	Brigadier general Milutin Đurović (born 1974)	16 April 2021	10 June 2022	1 year, 55 days	Montenegrin Ground Army	
6	Zoran Lazarević	Brigadier general Zoran Lazarević	10 June 2022	3 June 2025	2 years, 357 days	Montenegrin Ground Army	
7	Miodrag Vuksanović	Brigadier general Miodrag Vuksanović	3 June 2025	Incumbent	1 year, 151 days	Montenegrin Ground Army	–

== See also ==
- Armed Forces of Montenegro
