= Ljubiša Jokić =

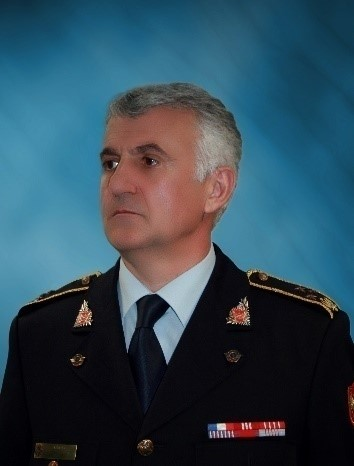
- As Chief of the Montenegrin Armed Forces, c. 2017
- Born: 24 September 1958 (age 68); Plav, PR Montenegro, FPR Yugoslavia (now Montenegro)
- Military career
- Allegiance: Yugoslavia; Serbia and Montenegro; Montenegro
- Branch: Yugoslav Air Force; Air Force of Serbia and Montenegro; Montenegrin Air Force
- Rank: Colonel general (Armed Forces of Serbia and Montenegro & Armed Forces of Montenegro)
- Commands: Chief of the General Staff (Yugoslavia) (2005–2006); Chief of the General Staff (Montenegro)(2017)
- Awards: Order of Military Merit (Yugoslavia)

Ljubiša Jokić (Serbian Cyrillic: Љубиша Јокић; born 24 September 1958) is a Montenegrin retired air force officer, who served as Chief of the General Staff of Serbia and Montenegro and Chief of the General Staff of Montenegro.

== Early life ==
He completed the Air Force High School in Mostar, Bosnia and Herzegovina, and graduated from the Air Force Military Academy's pilot training program in Pula, Croatia. He continued his education at the General Staff Academy, graduating in 1995. During this time he received the title of Flying Instructor and was awarded the Gold Flight Medal.

== Career ==
He worked as a flying instructor until 1989 when he was appointed as Commander of a basic flight unit. In 1994, he was appointed Squadron Commander. He ended his flight duties in 1997, becoming Chief of air-traffic-control at Podgorica airport. He returned to a military role from 1999 to 2003, first as an Air Brigade Commander in 1999 and then as an Military Airport Air Base Commander in 2002.

In 2003, he was appointed Head of the Military Cabinet of the President of and, at the same time, as Secretary of the Supreme Defence Council of Serbia and Montenegro. At the end of 2004, he aided in the transformation of the Army in and was named Deputy Minister of Defense for Human Resources. The apogee of his military career came as Chief of the General Staff of Serbia and Montenegro where he served from September 2005 to June 2006, until the dissolution of the state union.

Having been transferred to nascent Montenegrin Armed Forces, from July 2007 to December 2011 he served as Montenegro's military representative to the NATO and EU military committees.

In March 2012 he was appointed Senior Military Adviser to the Permanent Mission of Montenegro at the OSCE and Military Attaché in Austria, Czech Republic and Slovakia.

In August 2016 he was appointed as Senior Military Adviser of the Montenegrin MOD.

From January 2017 to October 2017 he was appointed Chief of the General Staff of the Montenegrin Armed Forces.

Military offices
Preceded by Dragan Paskaš	Chief of the General Staff of the Armed Forces of Serbia and Montenegro; 6 October 2005 – 3 June 2006	Succeeded by Zdravko Ponoš as Chief of the General Staff of the Serbian Armed Forces
Preceded by Dragan Samardžić	Chief of the General Staff of the Armed Forces of Montenegro; 13 January – 17 October 2017	Succeeded by Ilija Daković
