= Ministry of Defence (Serbia and Montenegro) =

Former government ministry responsible for military and defense affairs

- Serbo-Croatian: Ministarstvo odbrane/Министарство одбране
- Standard of the Minister of Defence (1995–2006)

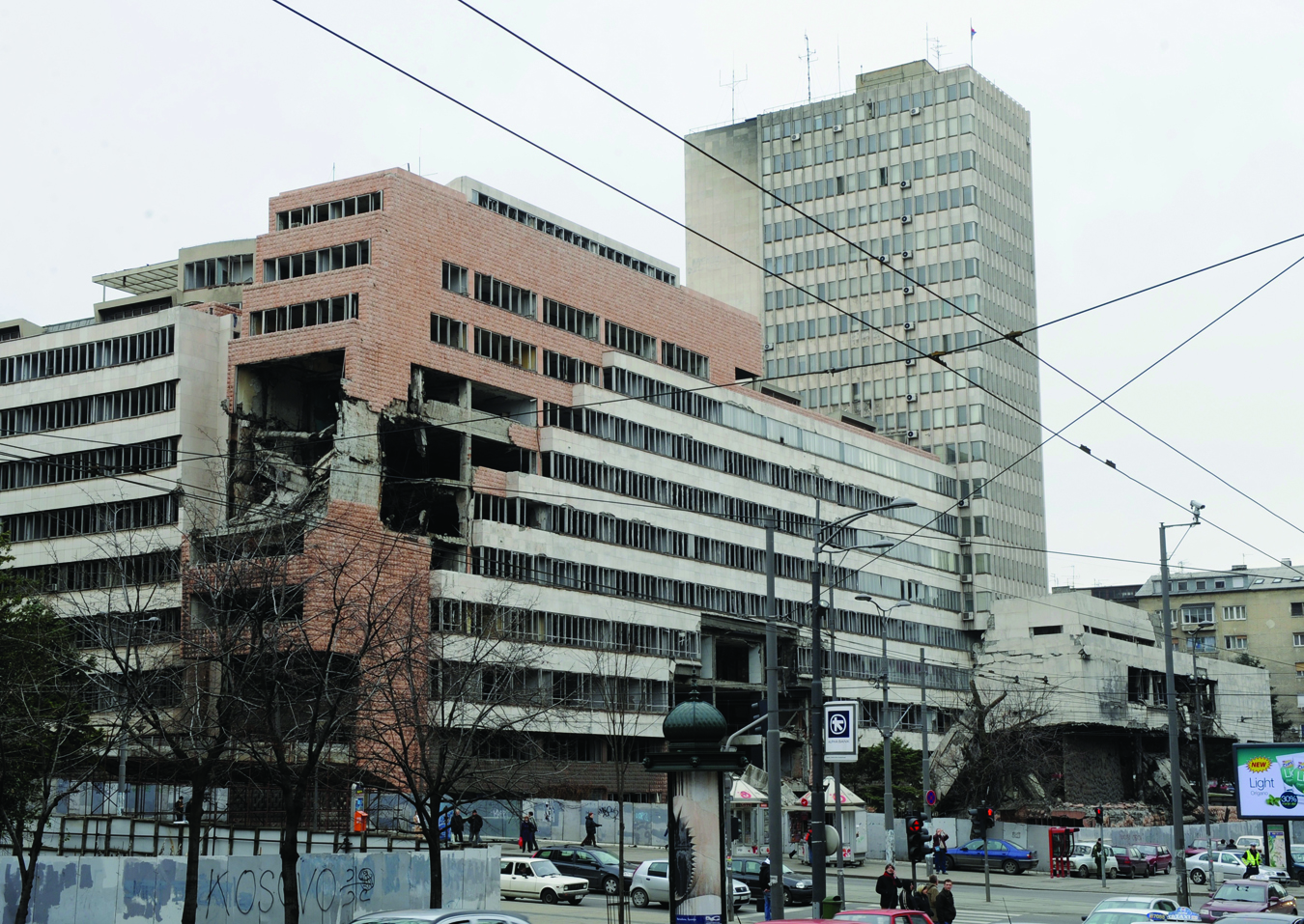
- The Ministry of Defence Building, damaged by a NATO bomb during the Kosovo War.

Ministry overview
- Formed: 14 July 1992; 34 years ago
- Dissolved: 4 June 2006; 20 years ago
- Jurisdiction: Serbia and Montenegro
- Headquarters: General Staff Building, Belgrade (1992–99); 44°48′20″N 20°27′40″E
- Ministers responsible: Milan Panić, first Minister of Defence; Major general (Ret'd) Zoran Stanković, last Minister of Defence
- Parent department: Federal Government of the FR Yugoslavia (1992–2003); Council of Ministers of Serbia and Montenegro (2003–2006)

The Ministry of Defence for the Federal Republic of Yugoslavia, later known as Serbia and Montenegro, existed from 1992 to 2006.

== List of ministers ==
Following the breakup of Yugoslavia and the secession of four out of six constituent republic in the SFR Yugoslavia the remaining two (Serbia and Montenegro) established a federation in 1992 called the Federal Republic of Yugoslavia (FR Yugoslavia). This lasted until 2003 when it was reconstituted as a state union called Serbia and Montenegro. In 2006 both countries declared independence and parted ways.

No.	Portrait	Minister of Defence	Took office	Left office	Time in office	Party	Defence branch
1	Milan Panić	Milan Panić (1929–2026)	14 July 1992	2 March 1993	231 days	Independent	none
2	Pavle Bulatović	Pavle Bulatović (1948–2000)	2 March 1993	7 February 2000 †	6 years, 342 days	DPS; SNP	none
3	Dragoljub Ojdanić	General of the Army; Dragoljub Ojdanić (1941–2020) (Note: Previously served as the Chief of the General Staff from 1998 to 2000.)	15 February 2000	4 November 2000	263 days	Independent	Ground Forces
4	Slobodan Krapović	Slobodan Krapović (born 1948)	4 November 2000	29 January 2002	1 year, 86 days	SNP	none
5	Velimir Radojević	Velimir Radojević (born 1956)	29 January 2002	17 March 2003	1 year, 47 days	SNP	none
6	Boris Tadić	Boris Tadić (born 1958) (Note: Afterwards served as the President of Serbia from 2004 to 2012.)	17 March 2003	16 April 2004	1 year, 30 days	DS	none
7	Prvoslav Davinić	Prvoslav Davinić (1938–2025)	16 April 2004	21 October 2005	1 year, 188 days	G17+	none
8	Zoran Stanković	Major general of the Sanitation (Ret'd); Zoran Stanković (1954–2021)	21 October 2005	4 June 2006	226 days	Independent	Ground Forces (Ret'd)

== See also ==
- Ministry of Defence (Yugoslavia)
- Ministry of Defence (Montenegro)
- Ministry of Defence (Serbia)
