= Pavle Bulatović =

Yugoslav Montenegrin politician (1948–2000)

Minister of Interior of the Federal Republic of Yugoslavia
- In office 14 July 1992 – 2 March 1993
- Prime Minister: Radoje Kontic
- Preceded by: Position established
- Succeeded by: Đorđe Blagojević

Minister of Defence of the Federal Republic of Yugoslavia
- In office 2 March 1993 – 7 February 2000
- Prime Minister: Radoje Kontic; Momir Bulatovic
- Preceded by: Milan Panić
- Succeeded by: Dragoljub Ojdanić

Personal details
- Born: 13 December 1948 Gornja Rovca, Kolašin, PR Montenegro, FPR Yugoslavia
- Died: 7 February 2000 (aged 51) Belgrade, Serbia, FR Yugoslavia
- Resting place: Gornja Rovca, Montenegro
- Party: Democratic Party of Socialists of Montenegro, Socialist People's Party of Montenegro
- Spouse: Slavjanka
- Children: Ivana, Balša, Jelena
- Parent(s): Nikica, Stana
- Education: University of Montenegro; Faculty of Economics

Pavle Bulatović (Montenegrin: Павле Булатовић; 13 December 1948 – 7 February 2000) was a Montenegrin politician in the Socialist Federal Republic of Yugoslavia and the Federal Republic of Yugoslavia.

Bulatović served as Interior Minister of Montenegro from 1990 to 1992, then as Federal Minister of Interior of FR Yugoslavia and as Minister of Defence of the Federal Republic of Yugoslavia from 1993 until his assassination in 2000. Bulatović represented the Socialist People's Party of Montenegro which was then allied in government with the Socialist Party of Serbia, led by Slobodan Milošević.

== Death ==
Bulatović was shot dead in Belgrade on the evening of 7 February 2000. The shooting took place at the restaurant of FK Rad in the Belgrade suburb of Banjica. He later died at the Military Medical Academy in Belgrade.

Immediately after the killing, the Yugoslavian government went into an emergency session and declared that Bulatovic had been the victim of terrorism. As of 2024, his assassination remains unsolved.

== See also ==
- List of unsolved murders (2000–present)
