= Peter Robinson (lawyer) =

American lawyer (born 1953)

Peter Robinson (born April 6, 1953) is an American lawyer who has defended political and military leaders at the United Nations International Criminal Tribunals. His clients include Bosnian Serb President Radovan Karadžić, Rwandan National Assembly President Joseph Nzirorera, Yugoslav Army Chief of Staff Dragoljub Ojdanic, and the lawyer for Liberian President Charles Taylor.

== Early life ==
Peter Robinson was raised in Chelsea, Massachusetts. He graduated from St. John's Prep in Danvers, Massachusetts in 1971. In 1975 he graduated from Macalester College in St. Paul, Minnesota with a Bachelor of Arts in History and Political Science. Robinson earned his Juris Doctor from Lewis and Clark Law School in Portland, Oregon in 1978.

== Career ==
=== Prosecutor ===
Robinson served as a federal prosecutor in the District of Oregon from 1978 to 1980, the District of Rhode Island in 1981, and the Northern District of California from 1981 to 1988. He was one of the prosecutors of the neo-Nazi group known as "The Order". Robinson also prosecuted a number of officials and customers of Centennial Savings and Loan Association, a Santa Rosa, California institution that collapsed in the 1980s.

=== Defense lawyer ===
In 1988, Robinson opened his own criminal defence practice in Santa Rosa, California. He authored an article about the change from federal prosecutor to criminal defence lawyer entitled "Switching Sides". From 1988 to 2000, he defended clients in federal courts throughout the United States.

== International criminal practice ==
=== International Criminal Tribunal for Rwanda (ICTR) ===
At the ICTR in 2002, Robinson was assigned as Lead Counsel for Joseph Nzirorera, the former President of the Rwanda National Assembly and Secretary of the ruling National Republican Movement for Democracy and Development MRND political party during the 1994 Rwandan genocide. Nzirorera's first trial began in 2003 and ended in a mistrial in 2004 after Robinson's motion to disqualify the Trial Chamber was granted. Nzirorera's second trial began in 2005 and he died in 2010 near the end of the defence case.

In 2010, Robinson refused to proceed with the trial of Joseph Nzirorera after one of his colleagues, Peter Erlinder, was arrested in Rwanda for "genocide denial". Robinson told the court that he could not stand idly by while a defense lawyer was arrested for defending his client. The Trial Chamber threatened Robinson with contempt of court, but dropped the matter after Erlinder was released.

Robinson returned to the ICTR in March 2011 when he represented former Rwandan Minister of Defence Marcel Gatsinzi, who was called as a witness before the Appeals Chamber in the case of General Theoneste Bagosora.

=== International Criminal Tribunal for the former Yugoslavia (ICTY) ===
Robinson worked at the ICTY as a legal consultant to the defence team of General Radislav Krstic in 2001 and to the defence team of General Dragoljub Ojdanic from 2002 to 2009. He served as co-counsel to Ojdanic on appeal of his conviction for aiding and abetting crimes in Kosovo during the 1999 war. General Ojdanic withdrew his appeal and was released in August 2014 after serving 2/3 of his 15-year sentence.

Former Bosnian Serb President Radovan Karadžić selected Robinson to be his Legal Advisor at the ICTY in 2008. Karadzic, who represented himself, was tried for genocide, crimes against humanity, and war crimes stemming from the 1991-95 Bosnian War. His trial began in October 2009 and ended in October 2014. Robinson delivered part of the closing argument for Karadzic. On March 24, 2016, Karadzic was convicted of 10 of 11 counts and sentenced to 40 years in prison.

Robinson has also served as a member of the Executive Board of the ICTY Association of Defence Counsel and as a member of the ICTY's Rules Committee.

=== Special Court of Sierra Leone (SCSL) ===
In 2011, Robinson was retained by Courtenay Griffiths, lead counsel to former Liberian President Charles Taylor at the Special Court of Sierra Leone. Robinson defended Griffiths in disciplinary proceedings stemming from Griffiths' refusal to proceed with the closing arguments in the Taylor trial. Those proceedings were later dismissed.

=== International Residual Mechanism for Criminal Tribunals (IRMCT) ===
Radovan Karadzic appealed his ICTY conviction to the IRMCT. Instead of representing himself on appeal, he chose Robinson to be his lawyer. On March 20, 2019, the IRMCT Appeals Chamber confirmed Karadzic's convictions and his acquittal for genocide, and increased his sentence to life imprisonment.

In 2015, Robinson began representing Jean de dieu Kamuhanda, the former Rwandan Minister of Higher Education, who is serving a life sentence after being convicted at the ICTR for the massacre of thousands of Tutsis at Gikomero Parish in Kigali-Rural prefecture. Kamuhanda contends that he had nothing to do with the massacres at the Gikomero Parish and is seeking a review of his conviction on the grounds of actual innocence.

In 2016, Robinson took on the case of another wrongfully convicted defendant from the ICTR. He represented former Rwanda Minister of Planning Augustin Ngirabatware, who contended that he had nothing to do with the distribution of weapons and incitement of the population in the town of Gisenyi. In December, 2017, Robinson withdrew from representing Ngirabatware.

In 2018, Robinson began representing Major Francois-Xavier Nzuwonemeye, who was arrested in France in 2000 and ultimately acquitted by the ICTR in 2014. Robinson asked the Residual Mechanism to order France to take Nzuwonemeye back so he can rejoin his family, who are French citizens. On April 17, 2019, the IRMCT Appeals Chamber declined to order France to take back Nzuwonemeye, but encouraged it to do so. In December 2021, unable to rejoin his family in France, Nzuwonemeye was relocated by the Residual Mechanism to Niger along with seven other acquitted or released persons from the ICTR. Robinson again represented Nzuwonemeye when the government of Niger placed him and the others under house arrest and threatened to expel them to Rwanda.

== Novel ==
In 2004, Robinson wrote a novel, The Tribunal, about an American prosecutor assigned to defend a Bosnian warlord at the ICTY.
