= Honour Guard Company (Montenegro) =

- Pocasna Garda Vojske Crne Gore; Почасна гарда Војска Црне Горе
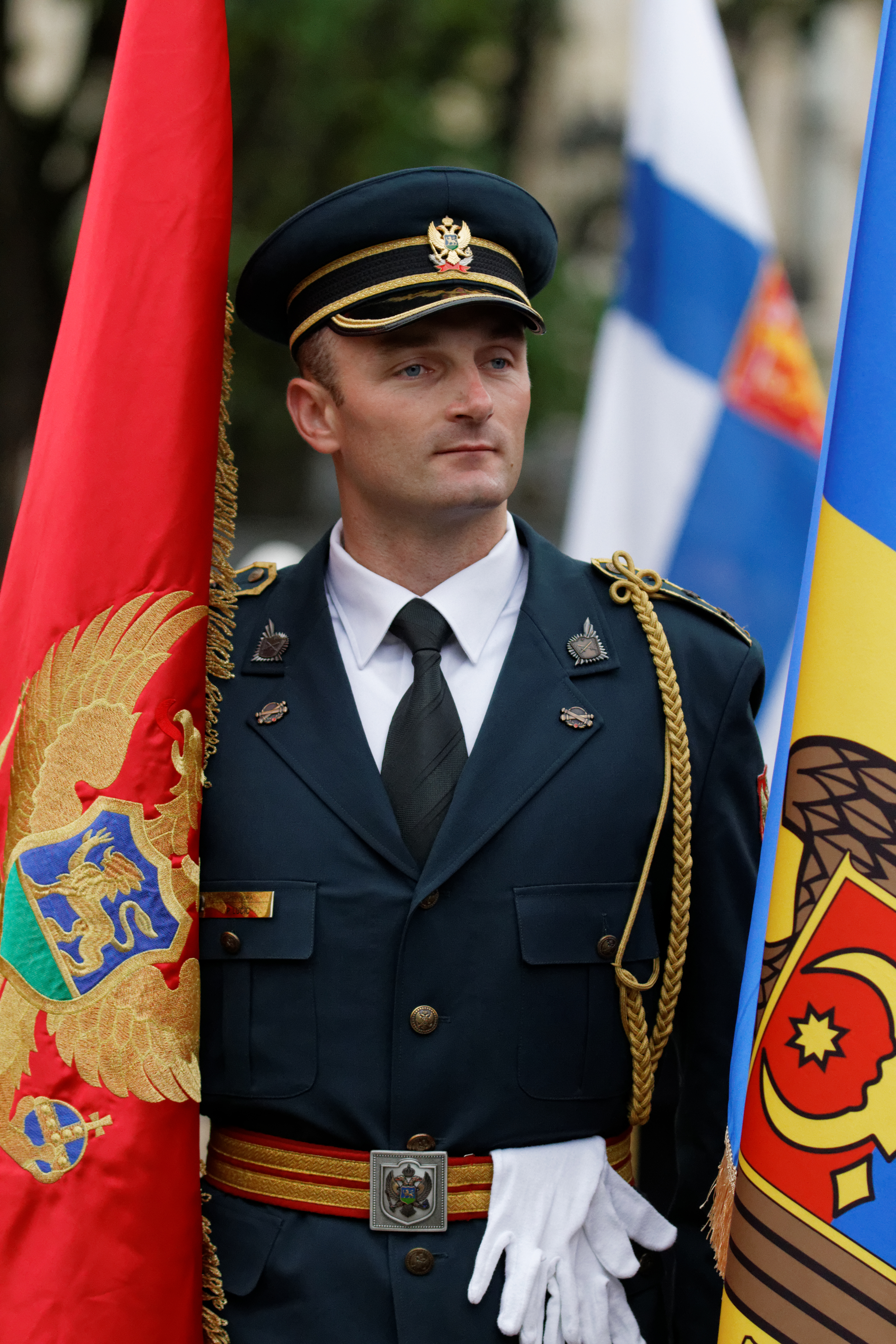
- A representative of the unit during the Bastille Day parade in Paris in 2014.
- Active: 26 June 2006; 19 years ago
- Country: Montenegro
- Branch: Armed Forces of Montenegro
- Type: Honor Guard
- Role: Ceremonial guard
- Garrison/HQ: Podgorica

Insignia
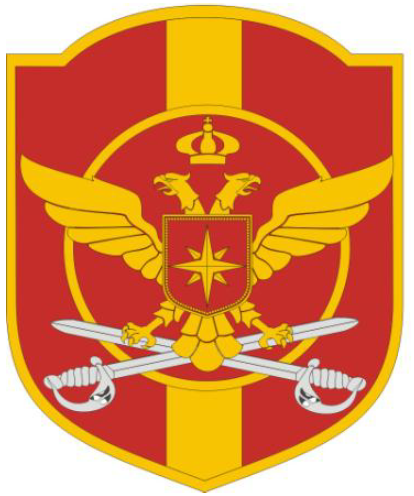
- Ceremonial Emblem

The Honour Guard of Montenegro (Montenegrin: Počasna Garda Vojske Crne Gore, Cyrillic: Почасна гарда Војска Црне Горе) is an honor guard unit of the Armed Forces of Montenegro.

== Overview ==
=== Operational history ===
The Honour Guard Company was established in 2006, simultaneously with the Independence of Montenegro. On 26 June 2006, the guard became active for the first time, taking part in the welcoming ceremony for the President of Serbia Boris Tadić. The company has had the honour of welcoming many world leaders such as Prince Charles and Mike Pence to Montenegro. The Honour Guard of Montenegro took part in the flag-raising ceremony during the accession ceremony at NATO Headquarters on June 7, 2017. In 2018, it took part in a military parade in the Polish capital of Warsaw on the occasion of the 15th anniversary of the country's accession to the European Union and the 20th anniversary of NATO membership. In early 2016, the guardsmen of the company received new uniforms.

=== Musical unit ===
The Military Band of the Honour Guard Company (Montenegrin: Vojni orkestar Počasne garde), is a musical unit which not only escorts the company, but also performs at music festivals as well as in the cultural and sports institutions of Montenegro. The repertoire of the band includes jazz, pop music, military music, and national anthems. It was originally formed in 1958. On 12 February 2011, Major Srba Stanković, who was the conductor of the Military Band since March 1999, passed away in Podgorica while in this role.

=== Mission ===
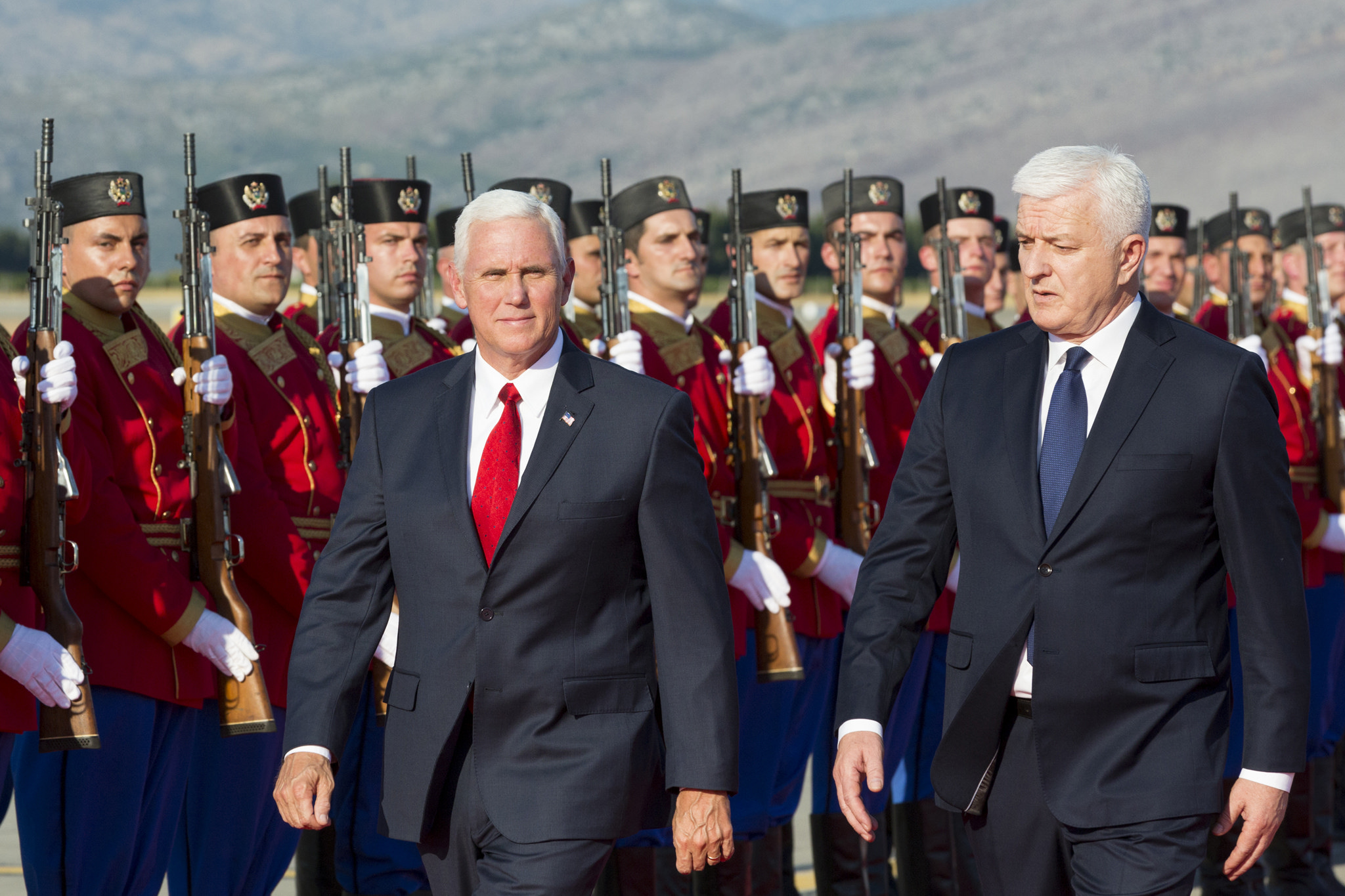
During the visit of Mike Pence to Podgorica in August 2017.

The official mission of the guard is to Protect historical places, and state facilities, as well as take part in the welcoming of heads of state and government, giving military honors, and protecting the territorial integrity and sovereignty of Montenegro. The company is made up of three platoons that perform that task. The company is armed with Yugoslavian M59/66 SKS Rifles. Members of the company are also present at the award ceremonies of recipients of state awards of Montenegro.
