= Ministry of the Interior (Serbia and Montenegro) =

Former government ministry responsible for internal affairs

- Serbo-Croatian: Ministarstvo unutrašnjih poslova/Министарство унутрашњих послова
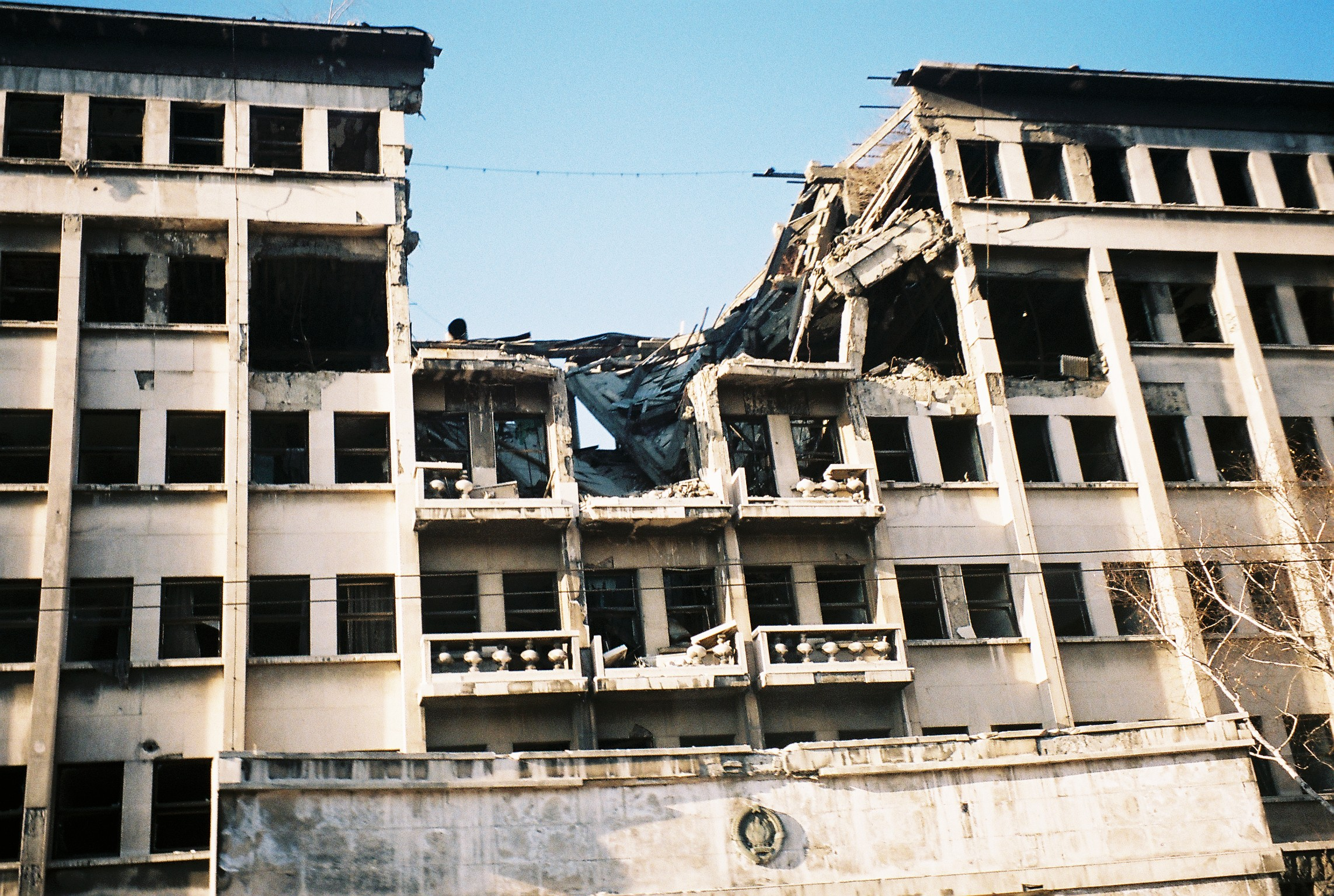
- The Yugoslav Ministry of the Interior building, damaged by a NATO bomb during the Kosovo War.

Ministry overview
- Formed: 14 July 1992; 34 years ago
- Dissolved: 17 March 2003; 23 years ago
- Jurisdiction: Serbia and Montenegro
- Headquarters: Belgrade
- Ministers responsible: Pavle Bulatović, first Minister of the Interior; Zoran Živković, last Minister of the Interior
- Parent department: Federal Government of the FR Yugoslavia

The Ministry of the Interior was the internal affairs ministry in Serbia and Montenegro, officially named the Federal Republic of Yugoslavia from 1992 to 2003.

== List of ministers ==
Following the breakup of Yugoslavia and the secession of four out of six constituent republic in the SFR Yugoslavia the remaining two (Serbia and Montenegro) established a federation in 1992 called the Federal Republic of Yugoslavia (FR Yugoslavia). This lasted until 2003 when it was reconstituted as a state union called Serbia and Montenegro. In 2006 both countries declared independence and parted ways.

No.	Portrait	Minister	Took office	Left office	Time in office	Party
1	Pavle Bulatović	Pavle Bulatović (1948–2000)	14 July 1992	2 March 1993	231 days	DPS
2	Đorđe Blagojević	Đorđe Blagojević (1933–2013)	2 March 1993	15 September 1994	1 year, 197 days	?
3	Vukašin Jokanović	Vukašin Jokanović (1939–2022)	15 September 1994	20 March 1997	2 years, 186 days	SPS
4	Zoran Sokolović	Zoran Sokolović (1938–2001)	20 March 1997	4 November 2000	3 years, 229 days	SPS
5	Zoran Živković	Zoran Živković (born 1960)	4 November 2000	17 March 2003	2 years, 133 days	DS

== See also ==
- Ministry of the Interior (Yugoslavia)
- Ministry of Internal Affairs (Montenegro)
- Ministry of Internal Affairs (Serbia)
