= Miodrag Vuksanović =

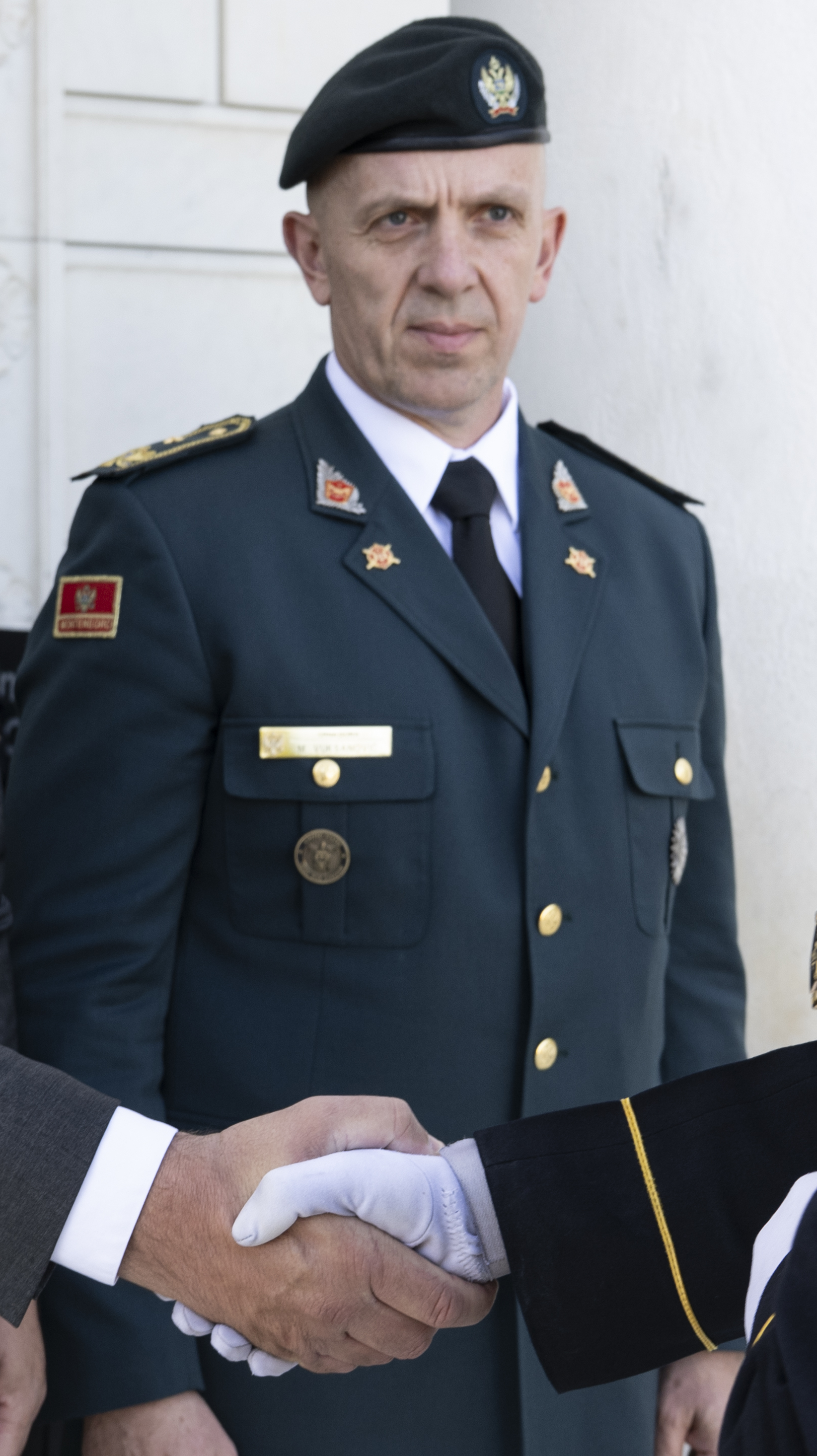
Vuksanović in September 2025.

Miodrag Vuksanović (Cyrillic: Миодраг Вуксановић; born 4 December 1967) is a Montenegrin brigadier general and the Chief of the General Staff of the Armed Forces of Montenegro since 3 June 2025.
