= Ground Forces of Serbia and Montenegro =

Ground Forces
- Копнена Војска; Kopnena Vojska
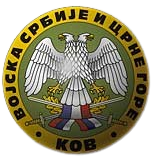
- (2003-2006) (1992-2003)
- Founded: 20 May 1992
- Disbanded: 5 June 2006
- Country: Serbia and Montenegro
- Size: 90,000 (1999)
- Part of: Armed Forces of Serbia and Montenegro
- Garrison/HQ: Belgrade, Serbia, Yugoslavia
- Engagements: Yugoslav Wars: Croatian War; Bosnian War; Kosovo War; Insurgency in the Preševo Valley

Insignia
- Patch

The Ground Forces of Serbia and Montenegro (Serbo-Croatian: Копнена Војска Србије и Црнe Горе, Kopnena Vojska Srbije i Crne Gore), known as the Ground Forces of Yugoslavia (Serbo-Croatian: Копнена Војска Југославијe, Kopnena Vojska Jugoslavije) from 1992 to 2003, was the ground-based military branch of the Armed Forces of Serbia and Montenegro. It was formed on 20 May 1992 from the remnants of the Yugoslav Ground Forces and was disbanded on 5 June 2006 when the State Union of Serbia and Montenegro was dissolved.

== Formation ==
The Ground Forces were composed of three armies, each made up of corps and independent units. The First Army was based in Belgrade, the Second Army was based in Podgorica and the Third Army was based in Niš.

The First Army drew heavily on the units and installations of the previous SFRY's First Military Region.

First Army	Second Army	Third Army
General Staff: 46th Motorized Brigade; 256th CBRN Defense Brigade; Infantry School Center; Engineering School Center; Artillery School Center; Armoured-Mechanized Training Center; Driving School	Special Forces Corps: 1st Armoured Brigade; 1st Guards Motorised Brigade; 63rd Parachute Brigade; 72nd Special Brigade; Military Police Battalion "Cobras"; Counter-Terrorist Battalion "Falcons"; 25th Military Police Battalion	Mechanized Corps: 252nd Armoured Brigade; 1st Guards Mechanised Division; 1st Guards Mechanised Brigade; 2nd Guards Mechanised Brigade; 3rd Guards Mechanised Brigade; 1st Guards Mixed Artillery Regiment; 35th Motorised Brigade
Novi Sad Corps: 36th Mechanised Brigade; 453rd Mechanised Brigade; 12th Mechanised Brigade; 18th Motorised Brigade (Reserve); 127th Light Infantry Brigade (Reserve); 16th Mixed Artillery Brigade	Podgorica Corps: 56th Engineer Regiment; 5th Motorised Brigade; 57th Motorised Brigade (Reserve); 179th Motorised Brigade (Reserve); 3rd Light Infantry Brigade (Reserve); 326th Mixed Artillery Brigade; 4th Light Infantry Brigade; 2nd Mountain Infantry Brigade; 72nd Border Battalion	Niš Corps: 4th Motorised Brigade; 2nd Motorised Brigade (Reserve); 211th Armoured Brigade; 805th Motorised Brigade (Reserve); 203rd Mixed Artillery Brigade (Reserve); 50th Light Infantry Brigade (Reserve)
Belgrade Corps: 140th Infantry Battalion; 151st Motorised Brigade (Reserve); 505th Light Motorised Brigade (Reserve); 153rd Light Motorised Brigade (Reserve); 22nd Mixed Artillery Brigade (Reserve); 585th Aviation Regiment (Reserve); 150th Light Motorised Regiment (Reserve)	Užice Corps: 37th Motorised Brigade (Peoples Hero): 168th Motorised Brigade (Reserve); 27th Light Motorised Brigade (Reserve); 134th Light Infantry Brigade (Reserve); 6th Light Infantry Brigade (Reserve); 7th Light Infantry Brigade (Reserve)	Leskovac Corps: 89th Motorised Brigade (Reserve); 135th Motorised Brigade (Reserve); 13th Light Motorised Brigade (Reserve); 21st Mixed Anti-Tank Brigade (Reserve); 42nd Mixed Anti-Tank Brigade (Reserve)
Kragujevac Corps: 51st Mechanised Brigade; 80th Motorised Brigade (Reserve); 130th Motorised Brigade (Reserve); 129th Light Motorised Brigade (Reserve); 20th Light Infantry Brigade (Reserve); 21st Light Infantry Brigade (Reserve); 24th Mixed Artillery Regiment (Reserve)	Independent Units: 202nd Mixed Artillery Brigade (Reserve); 60th Missile Regiment	Priština Corps: 15th Mechanised Brigade; 243rd Armoured Brigade; 549th Motorised Brigade; 125th Motorised Brigade; 252nd Armoured Brigade; 58th Light Mechanised Brigade (Reserve); 102nd Mixed Anti-Tank Brigade (Reserve); 52nd Mixed Artillery Brigade; 53rd Border Battalion; 55th Border Battalion; 57th Border Battalion; 52nd Light Artillery and Air Defence Missile Regiment; 150th Mixed Artillery Brigade
Independent Units: 544th Motorised Brigade; 14th Light Motorised Brigade; 310th Missile Regiment; 149th Missile Regiment; 240th Missile Regiment		Independent Units: 148th Motorised Brigade; 9th Motorised Brigade; 23rd Light Infantry Brigade (Reserve); 35th Light Infantry Brigade (Reserve); 311th Air Defence Missile Regiment

== Sources ==
- Curtis, Glenn E., ed. (1992). Yugoslavia: A Country Study (3rd ed.). Washington, D.C.: Federal Research Division, Library of Congress. pp. 248–250. ISBN 0-8444-0735-6. OCLC 24792849. Archived from the original on 20 October 2021.
