= Armed Forces of Montenegro =

Military forces of Montenegro

- Vojska Crne Gore; Војска Црне Горе

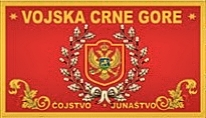
- Flag of the Armed Forces of Montenegro
- Motto: Čojstvo i Junaštvo (cnr); Humanity and Bravery (en)
- Founded: 1879
- Current form: 2006
- Service branches: Ground Army; Navy; Air Force
- Headquarters: Podgorica
- Website: www.gov.me/mod/vojska-crne-gore

Leadership
- Commander-in-chief: Jakov Milatović
- Minister of Defence: Dragan Krapović
- Chief of the General Staff: Brigadier General Miodrag Vuksanović

Personnel
- Military age: 18 years of age
- Conscription: No
- Active personnel: 2,350

Expenditure
- Budget: €134 million
- Percent of GDP: 1.9% 2024

Industry
- Domestic suppliers: TARA Aerospace and Defence Products AD
- Foreign suppliers: Austria; Bosnia and Herzegovina; Canada; Czech Republic; Israel; Italy; France; Japan; Germany; Romania; Serbia; Slovenia; Sweden; Spain; Turkey; United States

Related articles
- History: Military history of Montenegro
- Ranks: Military ranks of Montenegro

The Armed Forces of Montenegro (Montenegrin: Vojska Crne Gore / Војска Црне Горе) are the military forces of Montenegro. The Armed Forces consists of an army, navy and air force. The military currently maintains a force of 2,350 active duty members.

Although the military forces are established in 1879, the current form of Armed Forces of Montenegro can trace its origins to 1969 when Socialist Montenegro formed its own Territorial Defense Forces within the second Yugoslavia. The bulk of its equipment and forces were inherited from the Armed Forces of Serbia and Montenegro, which was formed from the collapsed Yugoslav People's Army in 1992; as Montenegro contained the entire coastline of the former union, it retained the entire naval force.

On 5 June 2017, Montenegro joined NATO as the 29th member.

== Command ==
The President of Montenegro (currently Jakov Milatović) is the Commander in Chief of the Armed Forces. The Ministry of Defence is the government department charged with formulating and executing defence policy. The department is administered by the Minister of Defence. The General Staff is an organizational unit of the Ministry of Defense and the staff body responsible for the preparation, command and use of the armed forces in peace and war. The Chief of the General Staff is the senior-most officer of the armed forces and is an appointment that can be held by an Brigadier general.

== Bases ==
=== Air bases ===
- Golubovci Airbase (Podgorica)

=== Naval bases ===
- Bar Naval Base
- Pero Ćetković Base
- Pristan Base

=== Army bases ===
- Milovan Šaranović Army Base
- Nikšić Army Base
- V. K. Volođa Army Base
- Breza Army Base
- Masline Army Base
- Аndrijevica Army Base

== Units and structure ==
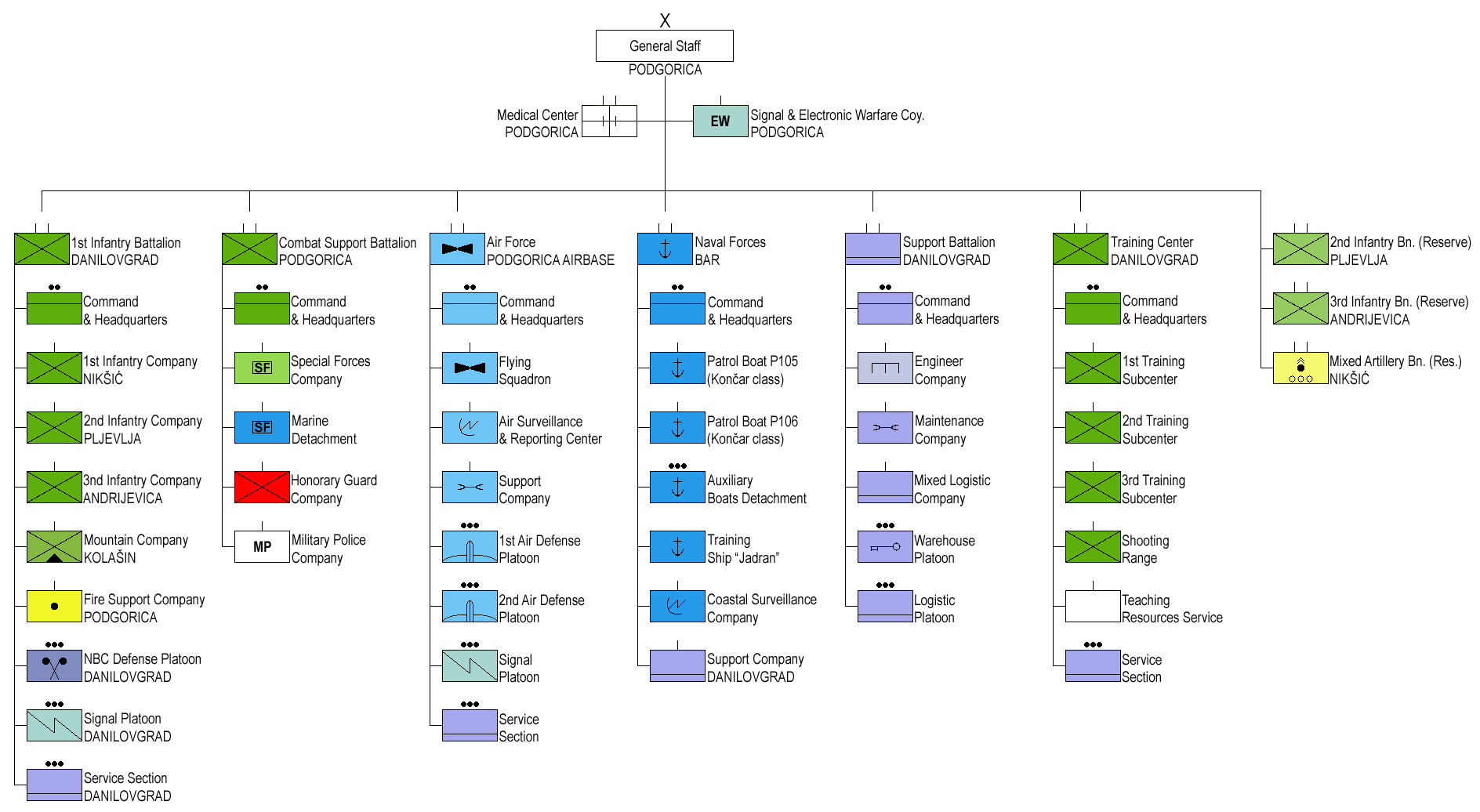
Armed Forces of Montenegro organization 2021

- General Staff, in Podgorica
  - 1st Infantry Battalion, in Danilovgrad
    - 1st Infantry Company, in Nikšić
    - 2nd Infantry Company, in Pljevlja
    - 3nd Infantry Company, in Andrijevica
    - Mountain Infantry Company, in Kolašin
    - Fire Support Company, in Podgorica
    - Signal Platoon, in Danilovgrad
    - NBC Defence Platoon, in Danilovgrad
    - Service Section, in Danilovgrad
  - Air Force, at Podgorica Airbase
    - Flying Squadron
    - Air Surveillance & Reporting Centre, in Golubovci, reports to NATO's Integrated Air Defense System CAOC Torrejón in Spain
    - Support Company
    - Signal Platoon
    - 1st Air-Defence Platoon
    - 2nd Air-Defence Platoon
    - Service Section
  - Navy, in Bar
    - Patrol Boat P105
    - Patrol Boat P106
    - Coastal Surveillance Company
    - Training Ship "Jadran"
    - Auxiliary Boats Detachment
    - Support Company, in Danilovgrad
  - Combat Support Battalion, in Podgorica
    - Special Forces Company
    - Marine Detachment
    - Military Police Company
    - Honorary Guard Company
  - Support Battalion, in Danilovgrad
    - Engineer Company
    - Maintenance Company
    - Mixed Logistic Company
    - Warehouse Platoon
    - Logistic Platoon
  - 2nd Infantry Battalion (Reserve), in Pljevlja
  - 3rd Infantry Battalion (Reserve), in Andrijevica
  - Mixed Artillery Battalion (Reserve), in Nikšić
  - Training Center, in Danilovgrad
  - Medical Center, in Podgorica
  - Signal and Electronic Warfare Company, in Podgorica

== The military before 1918 ==
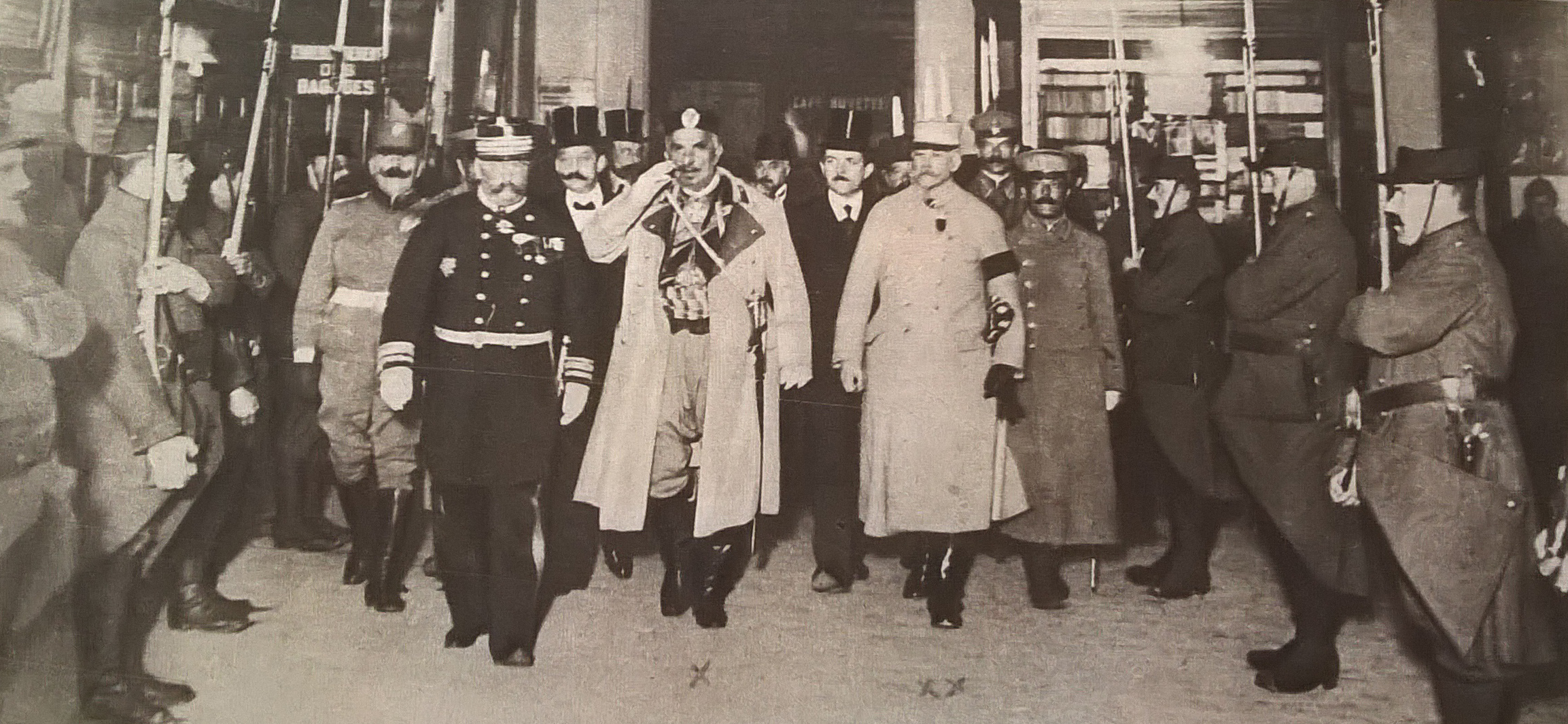
The King's Militia salutes Nicholas I in Lyon, France after his exile

After military successes in the wars 1876–1878 during which the Principality of Montenegro was enlarged by a large territory, from the Tara River in the north to the Adriatic Sea in the south (liberated towns Podgorica, Nikšić, Kolašin, Andrijevica, Bar and Ulcinj), reorganization in Montenegrin army was conducted in 1880. Each kapetanija (municipality) formed its reserve battalion. There were 42 battalions in total. Since 1881, regular military exercises were conducted.

Supreme Commander of the Montenegrin army was the monarch, Prince / King Nikola I. Operational command, organization and financial support of the Montenegrin army was entrusted to the Ministry of Defence, the department of the Government of the Principality / Kingdom of Montenegro.

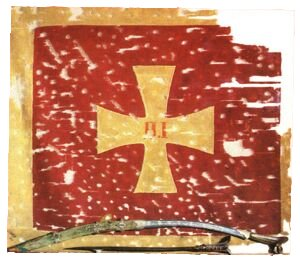
Montenegrin military Krstaš barjak riddled with bullets after victory in the Battle of Vučji Do

General Staff of the Montenegrin army was part of the Ministry of Defence.

In 1882 first 14 Montenegrins were sent to officer schools abroad, particularly in Italy and Russia. In 1886, 10 of them completed their education and they become first trained officers in Montenegrin warrior history. These Montenegrin officers held courses in Podgorica, Nikšić and Cetinje.

In September 1895, the first permanent Infantry NCO school in Podgorica was opened, and the first NCOs got desečar rank. At the end of 1896, artillery officer school in Cetinje was established – the first Montenegrin officer school.

=== Formations ===
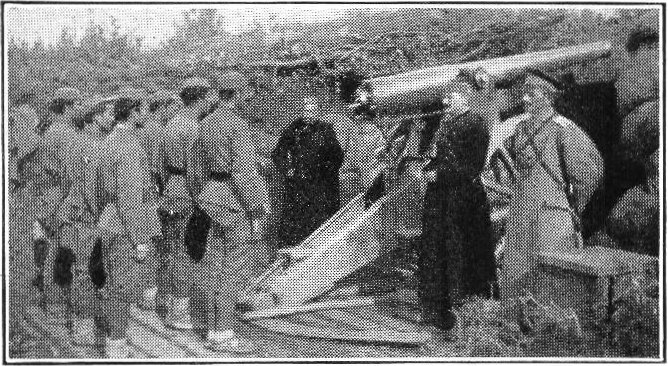
Montenegrin Artillery

In 1906 Montenegrin army received the first systematized regulations, and the Law on Organization of the Army was adopted in 1910. Infantry and artillery, were established, followed by two specialized branches (reconnaissance and pioneering), and additional branches (medics, military workshop, the military court staff, gendarmerie and logistics).

In 1913 the Montenegrin gendarmerie became a special Military Police unit.

Since the establishment of the internal Montenegrin telecommunications system in 1869, vital for the flow of military-defence information, it was under the jurisdiction of Ministry of the military.

Until 1912, the territory of the Kingdom of Montenegro was divided into four divisional areas:

- 1.Cetinje divisional area
- 2.Podgorica divisional area
- 3.Nikšić divisional area
- 4.Kolašin divisional area

After wars 1912–1913 additional two divisional areas were established:

- 5.Pljevlja divisional area
- 6.Peć divisional area

By 1912, the Montenegrin Army had 11 brigade areas, 52 districts and 322 battalion troop areas. Divisions were composed of 2–3 Infantry Brigade.

Each divisional command had three artillery batteries. On the eve of the First Balkan War Kingdom of Montenegro lined up 55,000 soldiers.

After the establishment of the Kingdom of Montenegro in 1910, Montenegro was involved in three wars with the first one being the First Balkan War, in alliance with Serbia, Greece, Romania, and Bulgaria against the Ottoman Empire. The Second Balkan War was fought between Montenegro, Serbia, Greece, Romania and the Ottoman Empire against Bulgaria, with Bulgaria consequently losing significant territory in the north, Thrace, and Macedonia.

The Military of Montenegro before 1918, was much larger than today's military. During World War I, Montenegro mobilised 50,000 troops. The Commander-in-Chief was King Nikola I of Montenegro, while the General of Staff was Božidar Janković. Units included:

- Pljevlja Division

The Pljevlja Division was commanded by Brigadier Luka Gojnić. The division was made up of 10 battalions. It had around 6,000 soldiers and patrolled the area east from Pljevlja.

- Herzegovina Detachment

The Herzegovina Detachment was commanded by Serdar (Count) Janko Vukotić. The detachment was made up of 15 battalions. It had around 15,000 soldiers, and patrolled the border with Herzegovina.

- Lovćen Detachment

The Lovćen Detachment was commanded by divizijar Mitar Martinović. The detachment was made up of 18 battalions. It had around 8,000 soldiers, and patrolled the areas of Lovćen and Sutorman.

- Old Serbia' Detachment

The 'Old Serbia' Detachment was commanded by Brigadier Radomir Vešović. The detachment was made up of 13 battalions. It had around 6,000 soldiers and secured the Albanian border.

=== Uniforms ===
Most soldiers of the Montenegrin army had no uniforms. At mobilization, the soldiers were issued with a rifle and a badge to put on the cap. Both soldiers and officers in the reserve wore national costume. The badges in the caps had different designs depending on the rank of the wearer.

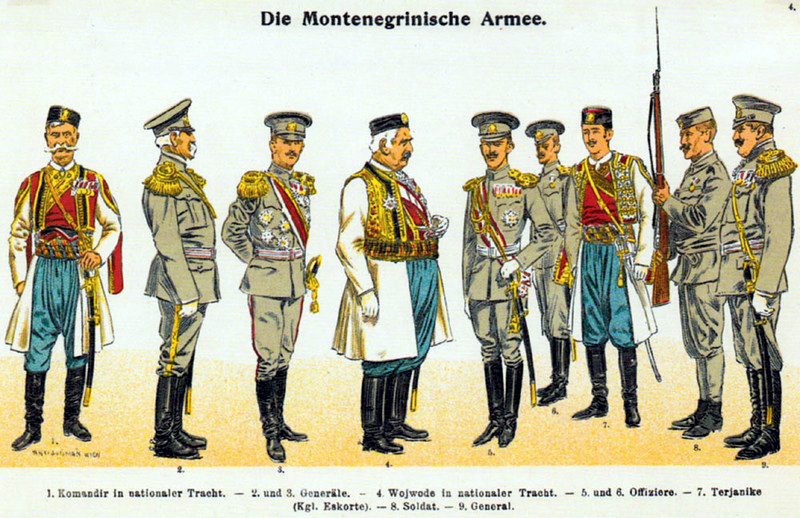
Dress Uniforms. 1. Komandir in national costume, 2/3. Divizijar, 4. Vojvod in national costume, 5/6. Officers, 7. Officer of the Royal Escort in national costume, 8. Private soldier, 9. Divizijar.

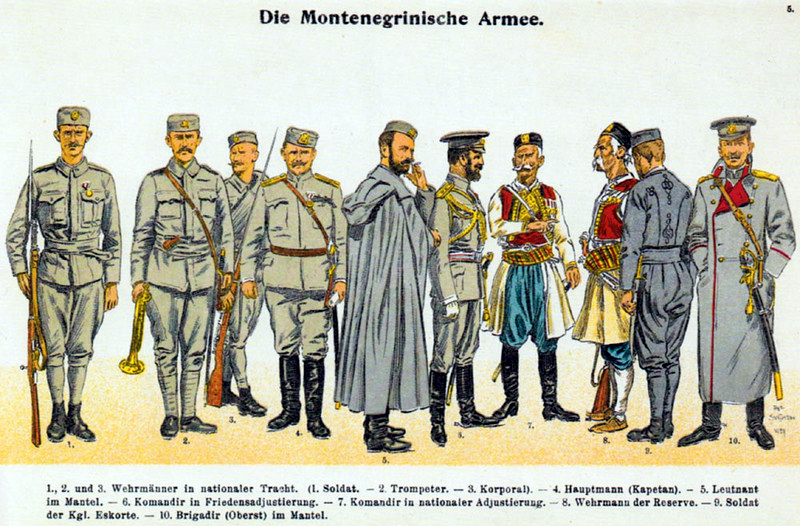
Field Uniforms. 1. Private soldier, 2. Bugler, 3. Corporal (all in field uniforms), 4.Captain in field uniform, 5. Lieutenant in cloak, 6. Komandir in field uniform, 7. Komandir, 8. Reserve soldier (both in national costumes), 9. Soldier of the Royal Escort in field uniform, 10. Brigadir in great coat.

=== Ranks and badges ===
All Montenegrins between 18 and 62 years were conscripts. Recruitment was done three times a year, and the recruits are in peacetime had to be at least 25 years old.

- Officer ranks were: potporučnik, poručnik, kapetan, komandir, brigadir, divizijar
- NCO ranks were: desečar, donarednik, narednik
- Ceremonial ranks were: serdar, vojvoda

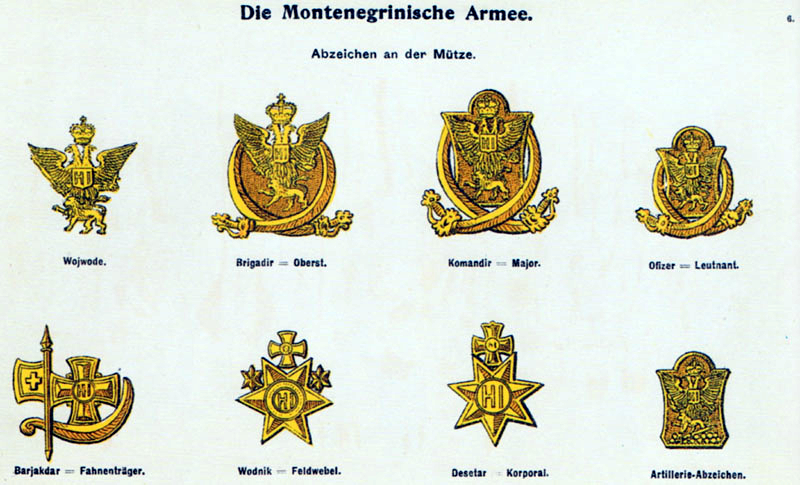
Cap Badges. From left to right. First row: Vojvod, Brigadir, Komandir, Lieutenant: Second row: Barjakdar = ensign, Vodnik = sergeant, Desečar = corporal, gunner

== Peacekeeping operations ==
Montenegro participates in peace operations under the NATO and UN auspices as military troops and observers. Minister of Defense said that 85 soldiers are trained for international missions. Montenegrin soldiers are trained by the German Bundeswehr.

Montenegro sent 45 troops and medical personnel to the ISAF mission in Afghanistan and later took part in the Resolute Support Mission.

Montenegro also participates in UN peacekeeping missions in Liberia, UNMIL, Cyprus, UNFICYP as military observers and Somalia, EU-NAVFOR.

Current Mission	Organization	Country	Nr. of personnel
NATO EFP	NATO	Latvia	Special forces team
KFOR	NATO	Kosovo	2 Officers
UNMIL	UN	Liberia	Officers as military observers
UNFICYP	UN	Cyprus	Officers as military observers
MINURSO	UN	Western Sahara	Officers as military observers
EU-NAVFOR	EU	Somalia	12 Members (APVD team)
EUTM Mali	EU	Mali	Officers training

== Equipment ==
=== Ground Army ===
Weapon	Country manufactured	Cartridge	Quantity	Pictures	Notes
Pistols
Glock 17	Austria	9×19mm Parabellum			Standard gun of Montenegrin Military.
Zastava CZ99	Serbia	9×19mm Parabellum			Standard gun of Montenegrin Military
Tara TM9	Montenegro	9×19mm Parabellum			Currently in use.
Submachine guns
Heckler & Koch MP5	Germany	9×19mm Parabellum			Used by Special Forces.
Tara TM-9	Montenegro	9×19mm Parabellum			Similar to the Colt 9mm SMG, but with forward assist and Glock magazine compatibility.
Assault rifles
Zastava M59/66	Yugoslavia	7.62×39mm			Ceremonial rifle
MPT-76; MPT-55	Turkey	7.62×51mm NATO; 5.56×45mm NATO	30		15 × rifles in NATO calibre 7.62×51mm and 15 × rifles in 5.56×45mm NATO ammunition according to a protocol signed by representatives of the Turkish and Montenegrin defence ministries in Ankara on 1 October 2019.
Heckler & Koch G36	Germany	5.56×45mm NATO	655 (as of 2015)		Standard rifle of Montenegrin Military
Tara TM4	Montenegro	5.56×45mm NATO			Standard issue rifle in the Montenegrin Ground Army
Steyr AUG	Austria	5.56×45mm NATO			Used by Special Forces
Heckler & Koch HK416	Germany	5.56×45mm NATO			Used by Special Forces.
Zastava M70/M70A	Yugoslavia; Serbia	7.62×39mm			In reserve
Sniper rifles
Heckler & Koch PSG1	Germany	7.62×51mm NATO			PSG 1 and MSG 90 in service.
Zastava M93 Black Arrow	Yugoslavia; Serbia	12.7×108mm			In service
Zastava M76	Yugoslavia; Serbia	7.92×57mm Mauser			In reserve
Zastava M91	Yugoslavia; Serbia	7.62×54mmR			In reserve
Machine guns
Zastava M84	Yugoslavia; Serbia	7.62×54mmR			In service.
Zastava M72	Yugoslavia; Serbia	7.62×39mm			In reserve
Grenade launcher
BGA 30mm	Serbia	30×29mm			In service
Heckler & Koch AG36	Germany	40×46mm			In service
Anti-tank
M79 Osa	Yugoslavia	90 mm rocket			In service, planned to buy new man-portable anti-tank systems.
M80 Zolja	Yugoslavia	64 mm rocket			In service, planned to buy new man-portable anti-tank systems.
9M14 Malyutka	Soviet Union; Yugoslavia	64 mm rocket			In service
Mortar
M57	Yugoslavia	60 mm	43		In service
M69	Yugoslavia	82 mm	44		14 active, 30 in reserve
M74/M75	Yugoslavia	120 mm	32		In service.
Howitzer
D-30J 122 mm	Soviet Union	122 mm	12		In service.
Multiple rocket launchers
M-94 Plamen-S	Yugoslavia	128 mm	18		In service.
Armoured personnel carriers
model	country of origin	year of production	quantity	picture	notes
Oshkosh L-ATV	United States; Israel	2020 to 2024	67+?		The Gale Banks Engineering diesel engine develops 340 hp, gross vehicle mass (GVM) are 10.2 t, of which the payload is 3.8 t.: 55 vehicles are equipped with Elbit Systems RCWS (Remote Controlled Weapon Station) with a 12.7 mm heavy machine gun; 4 vehicles are equipped with Rafael Samson RCWS armed with M230LF 30 mm lightweight automatic chain gun, 4 vehicles are equipped with missile launchers for Spike LR HEAT and Spike SR missiles; 4 vehicles are command and reconnaissance vehicle; In May 2023 Montenegrin MoD signed a US$22 million contract with Elbit Systems for a purchase of an unspecified number of 120 mm SPEAR Mk2 mortar systems to be mounted on JLTVs.
ACS LAPV 5.4 Enok	Germany	2018	6		The diesel engine develops 184 hp, gross vehicle mass (GVM) are 5.4 t.
Otokar Cobra	Turkey	2016	1		The diesel engine develops 190 hp, gross vehicle mass (GVM) are 6.7 t. Light armoured combat vehicle for chemical, biological, radiological and nuclear reconnaissance.
Achleitner RCV Survivor	Austria	2010	4		The diesel engine develops 286 hp and 650 Nm, gross vehicle mass (GVM) are 8 t, of which the payload is 2.5 t. Reconnaissance and Command Vehicle (RCV) have modified chassis of the Toyota Land Cruiser 200.
TAM BOV VP М86	Yugoslavia		3		The diesel engine develops 150 hp and 490 Nm, gross vehicle mass (GVM) are 9.1 t.
Military light utility vehicle
Toyota Hilux RC 19 2.4 D 4x4	Japan	2020	20		The diesel engine develops 150 hp and 400 Nm, gross vehicle mass (GVM) are 3 t, of which the payload is circa 1 t.
Mercedes-Benz G-Class	Germany	2016	6		The 3.0 V6 diesel engine develops 240 hp and 600 Nm
Toyota Land Cruiser	Japan	2016	1		Ambulance vehicle
Isuzu D-Max	Japan	2016	1		The diesel engine develops 163 hp and 400 Nm, and is used for food transport.
Achleitner MMV Survivor	Austria	2010	16		The diesel engine develops 173 hp and 410 Nm, gross vehicle mass (GVM) are 4 t, of which the payload is circa 0.8 t. Militarized Mission Vehicle (MMV) is Toyota Land Cruiser but with reinforced suspension, additional engine and gearbox protection, modified brake system and the intake and exhaust system (so that the vehicle could go through water), can cary five soldiers and in the trunk there are five boxes for automatic rifles (one for each soldier) and painted in military color.
Pinzgauer 710	Austria				The petrol engine develops 90 hp and 185 Nm, gross vehicle mass (GVM) are 2,9 t, of which the payload is circa 1 t.
Military utility trucks
BMC 245-16P	Turkey	2023	2		The Cummins 615Be 245 diesel engine develops 245 hp and 925 Nm, gross vehicle mass (GVM) are 16 t, of which the payload is 8.5 t (off-road 5 t).
BMC 380-26P	Turkey	2023	1		The Cummins ISMe 385 30 diesel engine develops 380 hp and 1,834 Nm, gross vehicle mass (GVM) are 26 t, of which the payload is 15.5 t (off-road 10 t).
Iveco MUV	Italy	2019	1		Ambulance vehicle
Mercedes-Benz Unimog 405	Germany	2010			
TAM 110 T7 B/BV	Yugoslavia			Military Montenegro	The F4 L 413 R diesel engine develops 115 hp and 350 Nm, gross vehicle mass (GVM) are 7 t, of which the payload is 2.5 t (off-road 1.5 t).
TAM 150 T11 B/BV	Yugoslavia			Military Montenegro	The F6 L 413 R diesel engine develops 150 hp and 490 Nm, gross vehicle mass (GVM) are 11.4 t, of which the payload is 5 t (off-road 3 t).
FAP 2026	Yugoslavia				The OM 402 diesel engine develops 256 hp and 834 Nm, gross vehicle mass (GVM) are 21 t, of which the payload is 10 t (off-road 6 t).
Engineering vehicles
IMK TG-110; IMK TG-140; IMK TG-160; IMK TG-190; IMK TG-220	Yugoslavia				Tracked bulldozer
IMK ULT-160	Yugoslavia				Wheeled bulldozer
CAT 434F	United States				Backhoe loader

=== Navy ===
Class	Country manufactured	Variants	Quantity	Pictures	Notes
Frigate
Kotor class	Yugoslavia	– P-33 Kotor: P-34 Novi Sad	1; 1		2 in reserve
Fast attack craft
Končar class	Yugoslavia	– RTOP-405 Jordan Nikolov Orce – RTOP-406 Ante Banina	1; 1		Under reconstruction. The ship RTOP-405 reentered service in 2019. under name P-105 "Durmitor".
Transport and support
PO class	Yugoslavia	– PO91	1		1 in reserve
Tugboats
Salvage tug	Yugoslavia	– PR-41 (Orada): LR-77	1; 1		2 in active service
Sailing ship
Jadran	Weimar Republic	Used as a training ship	1		1 in active service
Motor sailboat	Yugoslavia	– Bojana: Milena	1; 1		2 in active service
Motorboat
Diving boat	Yugoslavia	-Ronilačka baraksa 81 -Ronilačka barkasa 85	1; 1		2 in active service
Motor boat Polycat	Netherlands		1		1 in active service
Motor boat	Yugoslavia	– ČM 33	1		1 in active service
Inflatable boat
Valiant 620PT	United Kingdom	Used by Marine Platoon	2		2 in active service
Motor yacht
Jadranka	Yugoslavia	VIP Yacht	1		Offered for sale 2018
Crane vessel
Floating Crane	Yugoslavia	LDI 18	1		1 in active service

=== Air Force ===
Aircraft	Country manufactured	Variant	Quantity	Pictures	Notes
Transport
Cessna 421 Golden Eagle	United States	Cessna 421B Golden Eagle	1		One for transport, medical evacuation and training.
Transport and utility helicopters
SOKO Gazelle	France; Yugoslavia	SA-341H HO-42 SA-341H HI-42 SA-342L HO-45 SA-342L HN-45M	4 1 2 4		not in use from 2020
Bell 412	United States; Canada	412EP 412EPI	1 2		One EP variant and two EPI variants. Medical evacuation, search and rescue, aerial firefighting, patrol.
Training helicopters
Bell 505 Jet Ranger X	United States; Canada	Bell 505 Jet Ranger X	2		Two for pilot training.
Air defence
9K32 Strela-2M	Soviet Union; Yugoslavia	Portable low-altitude surface-to-air missile			Planned to buy new man-portable air-defense systems.
Bofors 40 mm Automatic Gun L/70	Sweden	Autocannon 40mm L/70, works with GIRAFFE Radar			Planned for modernization.
Giraffe radar	Sweden	Early warning radar, works with Bofors 40mm L/70			Planned for modernization.

== Gallery ==
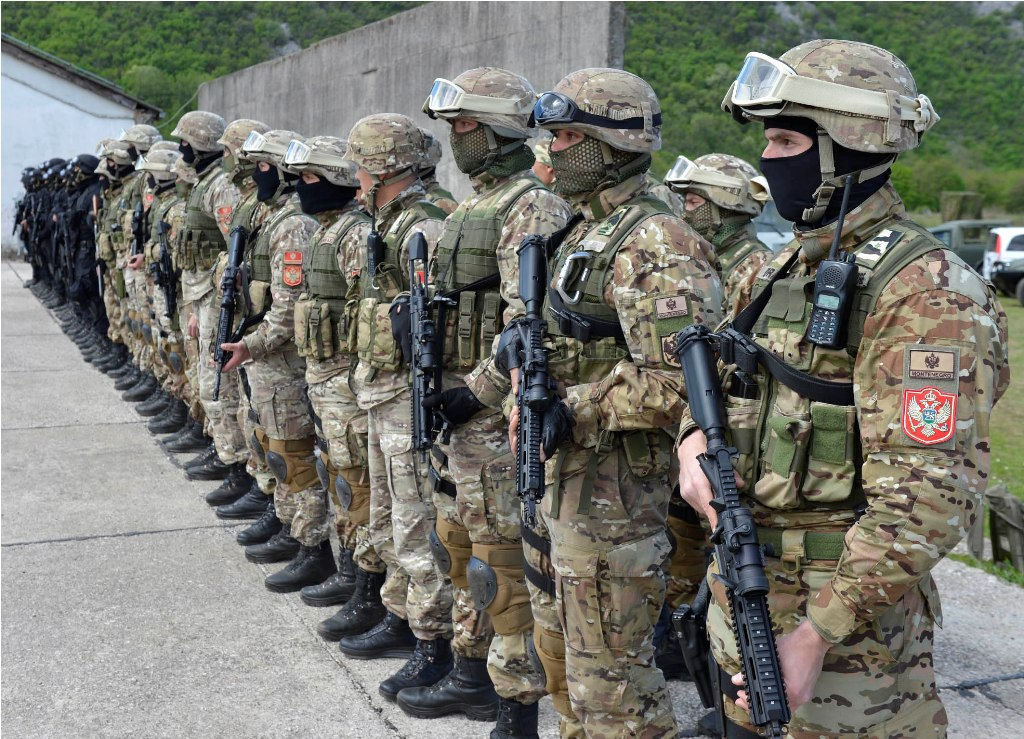
Members of Special Forces Brigade

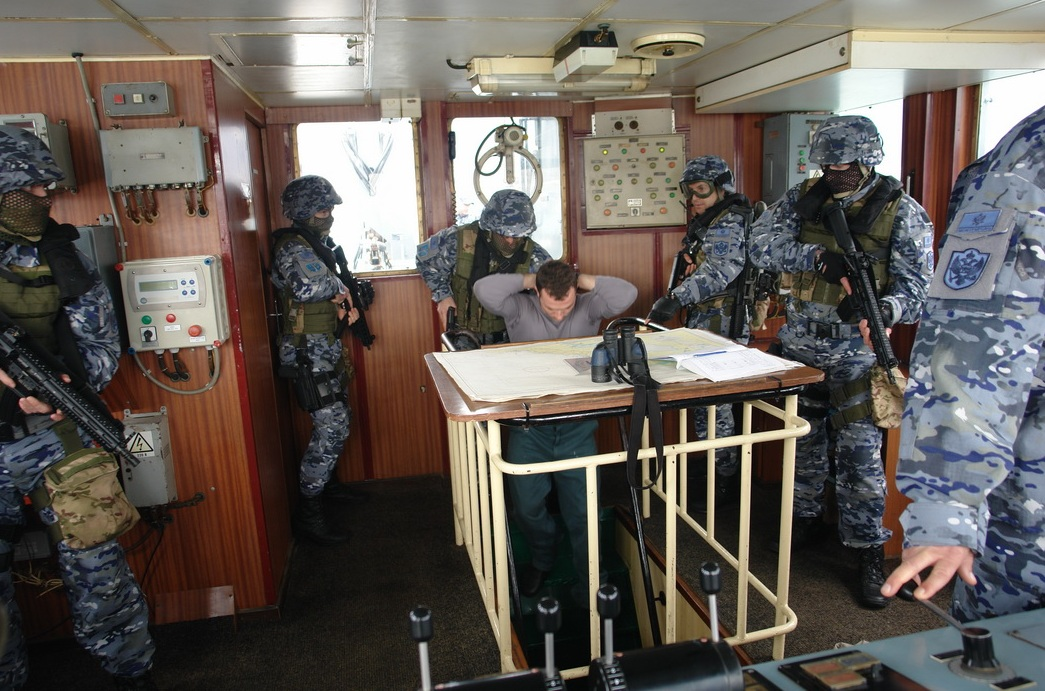
Members of Marine Detachment

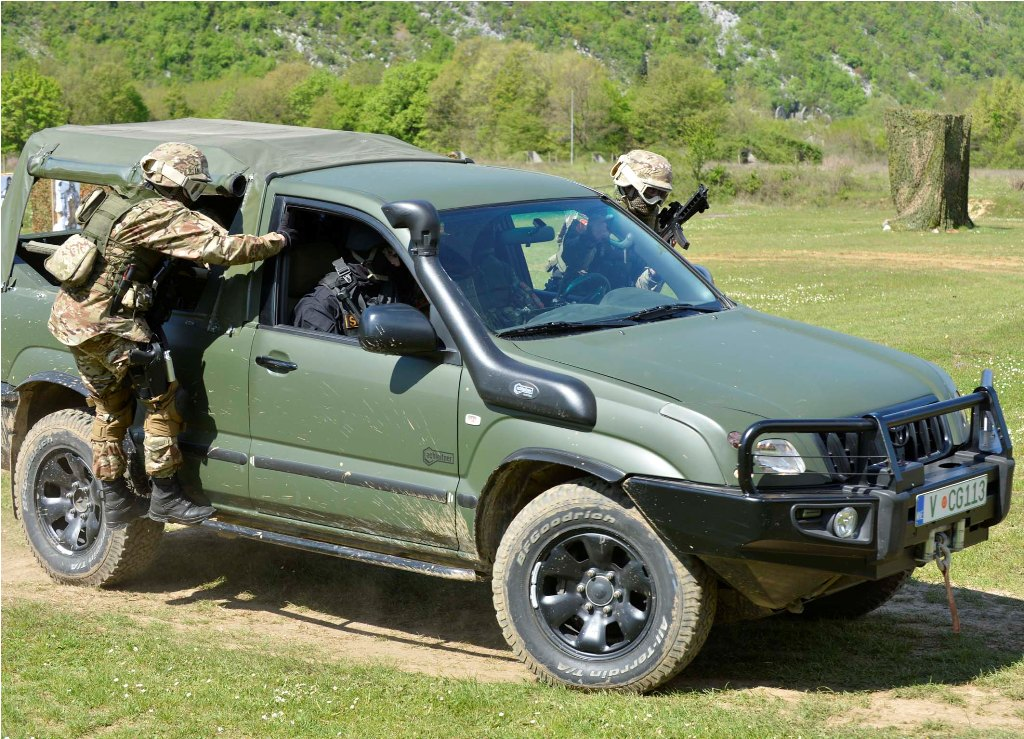
Special forces

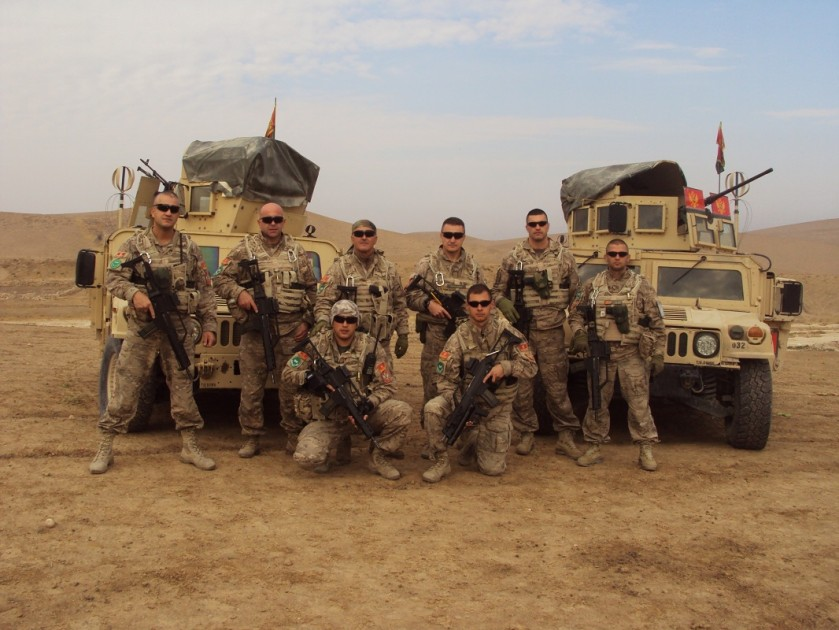
Montenegrin troops in Afghanistan

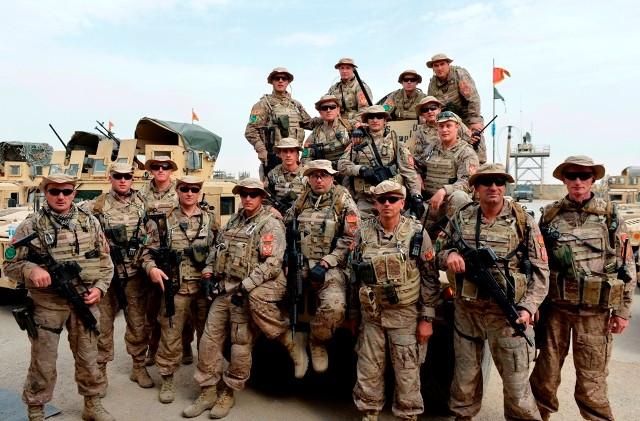
Montenegrin troops in Afghanistan

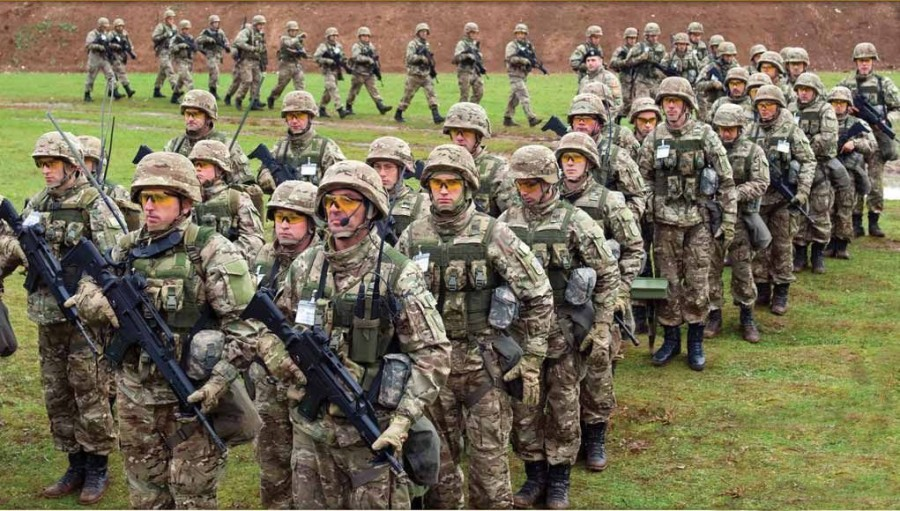
Infantry Company

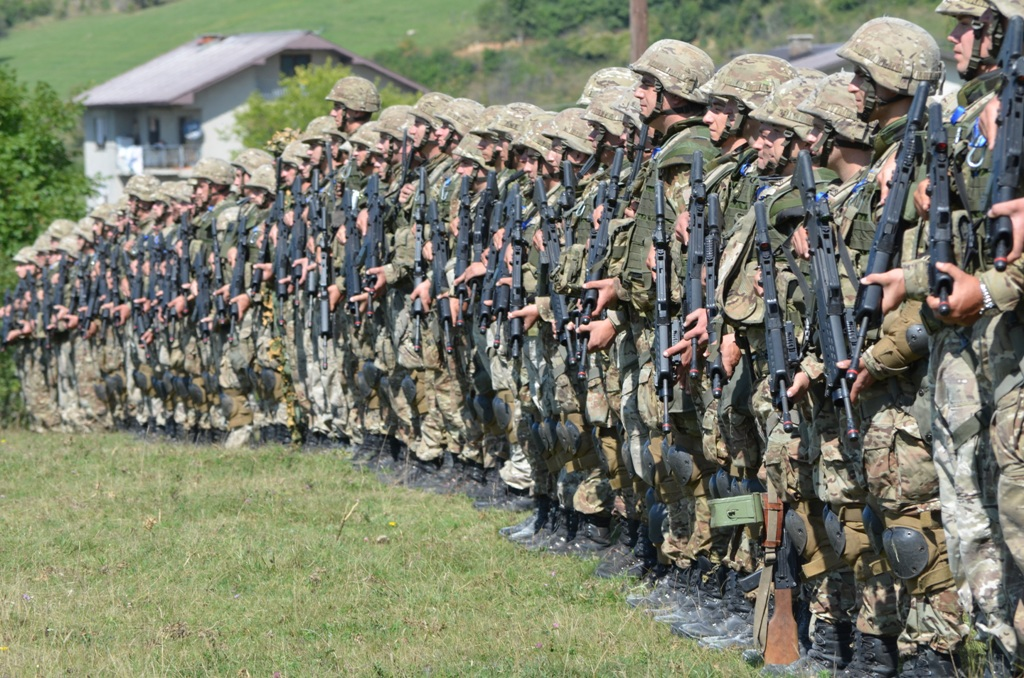
Infantry Company

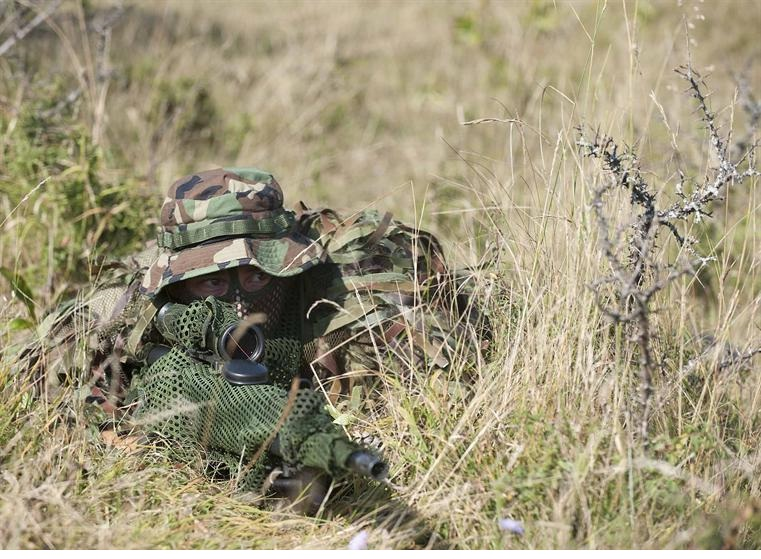
Sniper

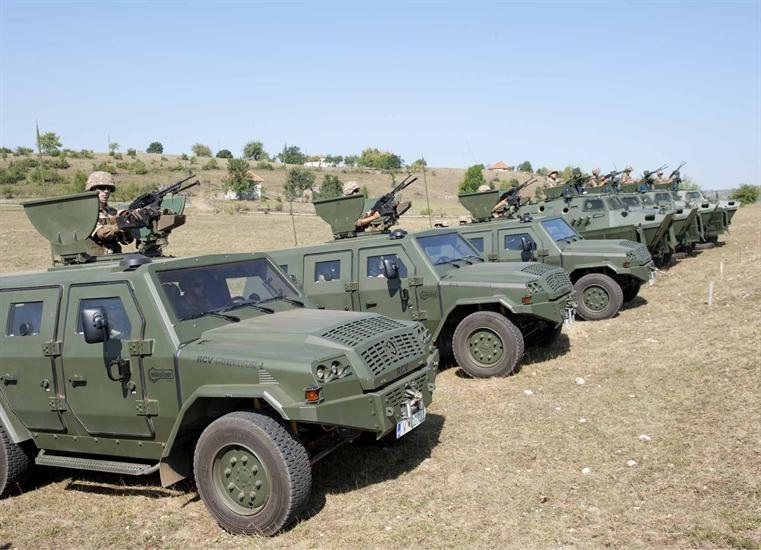
Achleitner RCV Survivor

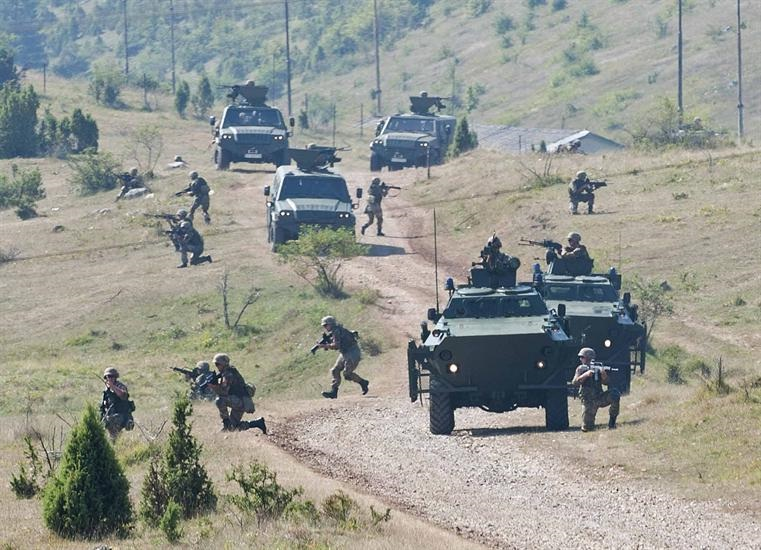
BOV M86

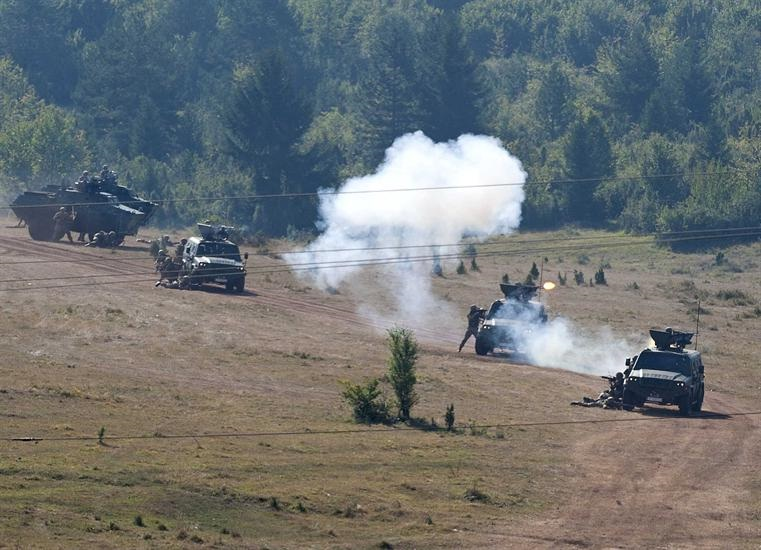
Combat drill

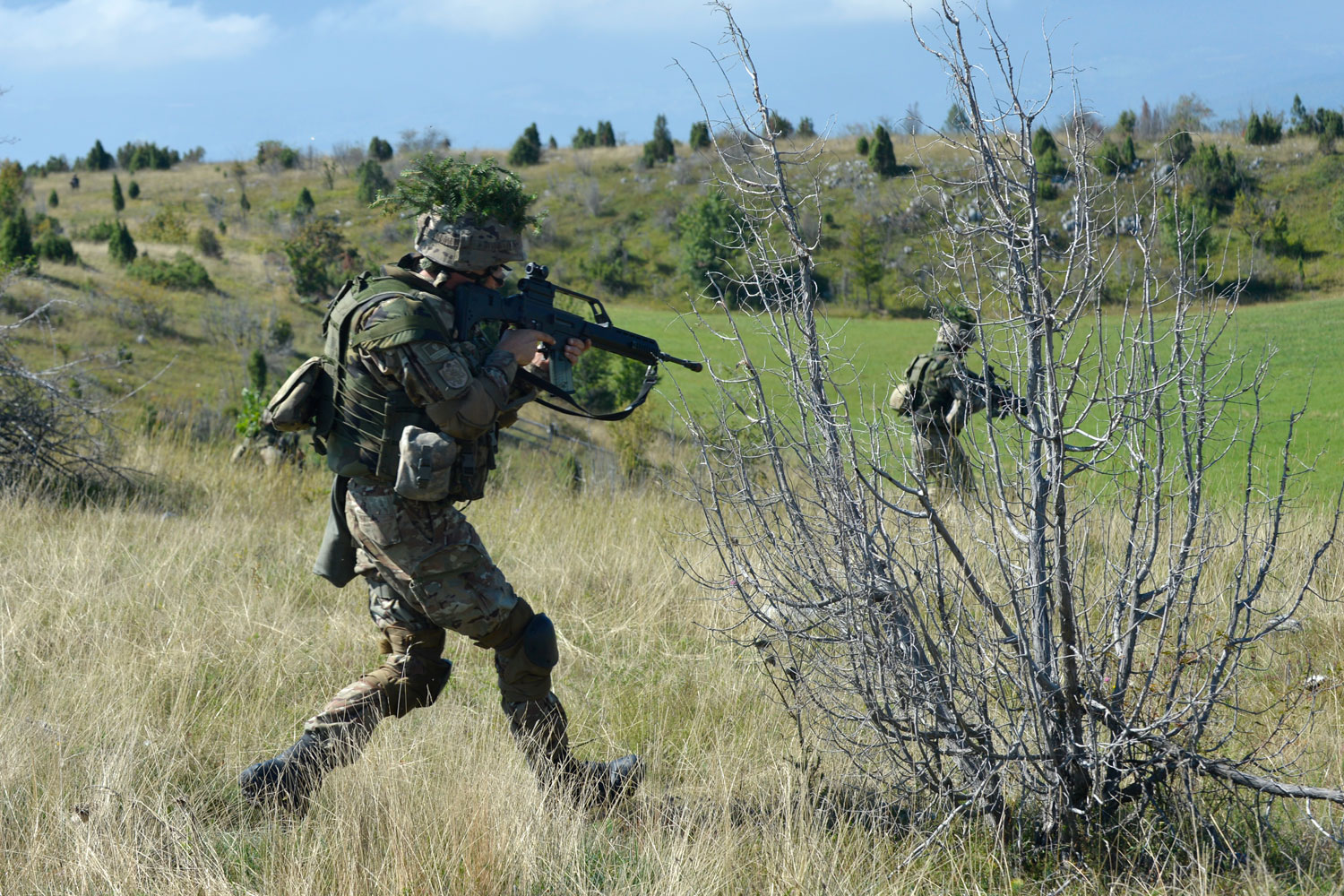
Soldier

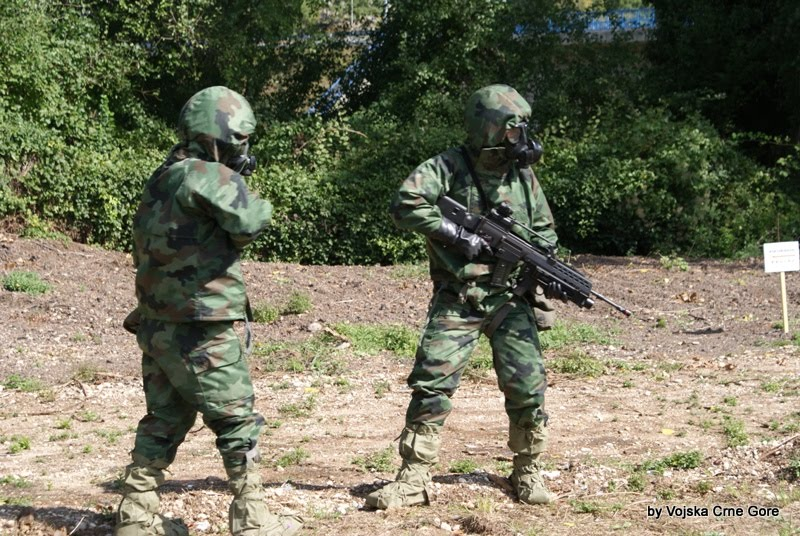
NBC Defence

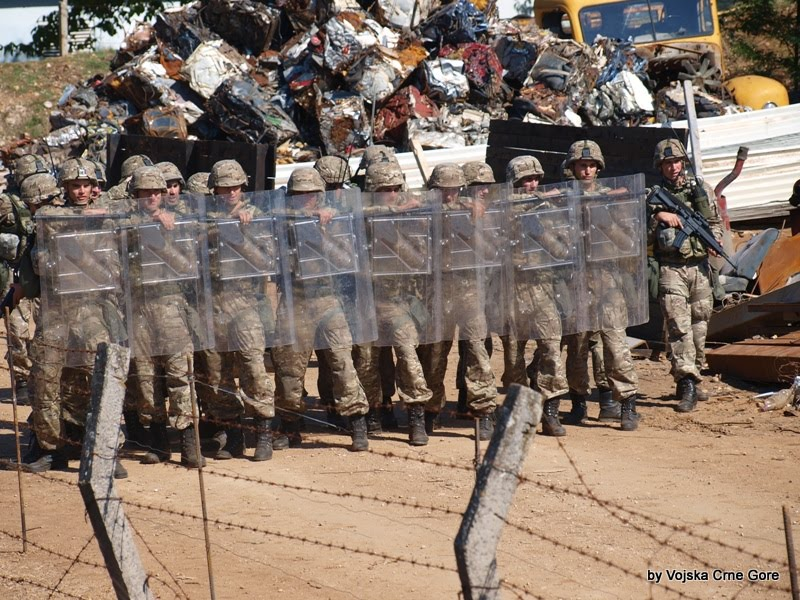
Military Police

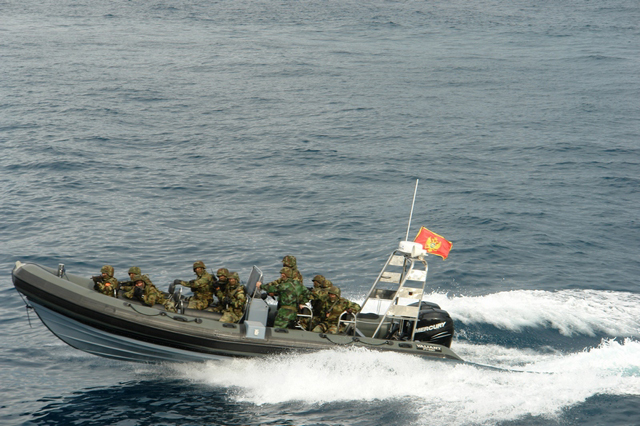
Montenegrin navy boat

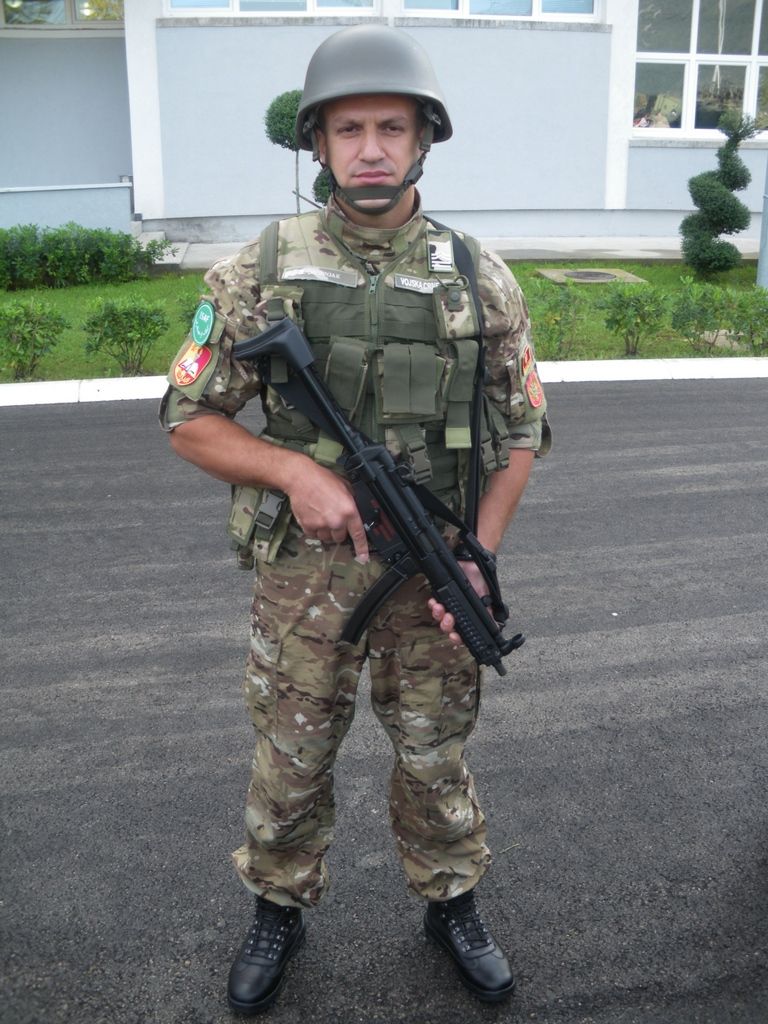
Montenegrin soldier holding a HK MP5

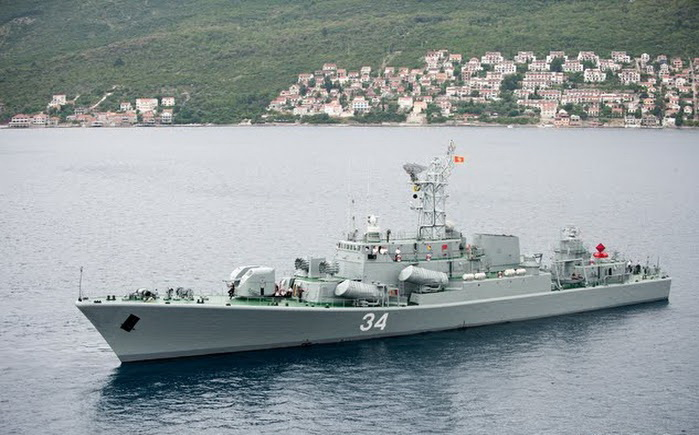
Kotor class Frigate

== See also ==
- Law enforcement in Montenegro
- List of wars involving Montenegro
