= Armed Forces of Serbia and Montenegro =

Military forces of Serbia and Montenegro

Armed Forces of Serbia and Montenegro Yugoslav Army
- Војска Србије и Црне Горе / Vojska Srbije i Crne Gore (2003–2006); Војска Југославије / Vojska Jugoslavije (1992–2003)
- Serbia and Montenegro Armed Forces' seal
- Founded: 20 May 1992
- Current form: Serbian Armed Forces; Armed Forces of Montenegro
- Disbanded: 5 June 2006
- Service branches: Ground Forces; War Navy; Air Force
- Headquarters: Belgrade, Serbia and Montenegro

Leadership
- President: Svetozar Marović (last)
- Prime Minister: Dragiša Pešić (last)
- Minister of Defence: Zoran Stanković (last)
- Chief of the General Staff: Ljubiša Jokić (last)

Personnel
- Military age: 19
- Conscription: Yes
- Active personnel: 114,000 (1999)
- Reserve personnel: 400,000 (1999)

Related articles
- History: Yugoslav Wars; Croatian War; Bosnian War; Kosovo War; Insurgency in the Preševo Valley; War in Afghanistan
- Ranks: Military ranks of Serbia and Montenegro

The Armed Forces of Serbia and Montenegro (Serbo-Croatian: Војска Србије и Црне Горе, Vojska Srbije i Crne Gore, [ВСЦГ/VSCG]) included ground forces with internal and border troops, naval forces, air and air defense forces, and civil defense. From 1992 to 2003, the VSCG was called the Yugoslav Army (Serbo-Croatian: Војска Југославије, BJ / Vojska Jugoslavije, VJ, lit. 'Army of Yugoslavia'), created from the remnants of the Yugoslav People's Army (JNA), the military of SFR Yugoslavia until the country disbanded. The rump state, then named Federal Republic of Yugoslavia, participated in the Yugoslav Wars with limited direct intervention of its own armed forces. Following the end of the Wars and the constitutional reforms of 2003 by which the state was renamed "Serbia and Montenegro", the military accordingly changed its name. The military was heavily involved in combating Albanian separatists during the Kosovo War and Preševo Valley conflict, and also engaged NATO warplanes during the 1999 NATO bombing of Yugoslavia.

Upon the dissolution of Serbia and Montenegro with the Montenegrin independence referendum (2006), a fraction of the joint military was given to Montenegro, with the bulk of the force remaining in Serbia. Montenegro inherited the navy as Serbia is landlocked.

== Organization ==
The Yugoslav Army (VJ) or Armed Forces of Serbia and Montenegro (VSCG) after 2003 were divided into branches, services, branches of services, and their specialties. The President of Serbia and Montenegro was the Commander-in-Chief—acting in accordance with the decisions of the Supreme Defence Council—and exercised command in both peacetime and war by issuing orders to the Chief of the General Staff, while administrative execution and defence policy were carried out by the Federal Government through the Ministry of Defence. This unified institution consisted of land, sea, and air branches referred to as:

- Ground Forces (KoV)
- War Navy (RM)
- Air force and Air Defence (RV i PVO)

The service branches were organized as follows: see Ground Forces and Air Force. The War Navy (RM) was organized as follows:

- War Command
- Flotilla
- 81st, 83rd, 85th, 108th, 110th
- 82nd, 69th, 367th
- 9th, 10th, 27th, 61st, 223rd, 9th

== Military assets ==
The Ground Forces maintained a substantial arsenal inherited from the JNA. Its armoured component was anchored by approximately 241 M-84 main battle tanks and 750 T-55 units, supported by 542 M-80A infantry fighting vehicles and various APCs, including the BTR-50, BRDM-2, and BOV. The artillery inventory featured a mix of towed and self-propelled systems, such as the 2S1 Gvozdika and M-77 Oganj multiple rocket launchers. Air defence was provided by a wide array of systems ranging from 40 mm Bofors guns and M53/59 Praga units to missile systems like the SA-6, SA-3, and various man-portable units including the SA-7 and SA-18. Infantry were primarily equipped with M70 series rifles, CZ-99 pistols, and an assortment of M84 machine guns and anti-tank weapons like the AT-3 Sagger and M79 "Osa".

The Air Force inventory comprised a diverse fleet of fixed and rotary-wing aircraft. Fighter and attack capabilities were provided by the MiG-21 and MiG-29, alongside the domestic Soko J-22 and Soko G-4 trainer and strike aircraft. Transport and utility roles were filled by the Antonov An-2 and Antonov An-26, with VIP transport provided by the Yakovlev Yak-40. The rotary-wing fleet included the Mil Mi-8 for transport, the Mil Mi-14 and Kamov Ka-28 for anti-submarine warfare, and the versatile Aérospatiale Gazelle for attack and reconnaissance duties.

== Navy ==
War Navy of Yugoslavia (1992–2003) War Navy of Serbia and Montenegro (2003–2006)
- Ратна морнарица Југославије (1992–2003); Ратна Морнарица Србије и Црне Горе (2003–2006)
- Emblem of the Navy from 1992 to 2003
- Active: May 20, 1992 – June 5, 2006
- Country: Serbia and Montenegro
- Garrison/HQ: Kotor, Montenegro, Serbia and Montenegro

Insignia
- Ensign

- Jack

The Navy, officially called the War Navy of Yugoslavia (Serbo-Croatian: Ратна морнарица Југославије, Ratna mornarica Jugoslavije, RM) from 1992 to 2003 and the War Navy of Serbia and Montenegro (Serbo-Croatian: Ратна Морнарица Србије и Црне Горе, Ratna Mornarica Srbije i Crne Gore, lit. 'War Navy of Serbia and Montenegro') from 2003 to 2006, was based in Kotor and was largely made of vessels inherited from the pre-1992 Yugoslav War Navy (Serbo-Croatian: Југословенска ратна морнарица, Jugoslovenska ratna mornarica, lit. 'Yugoslav War Navy'). During NATO's Operation Allied Force in 1999, the Navy took control over civilian shipping around Kotor, despite NATO's blockade and in several actions the navy's warships fired at NATO aircraft that were on their way to strike Yugoslav targets. The Navy claimed to have shot down three UAVs over Boka Kotorska. The images of the remains of one of them were displayed online.

- Koni-class frigate (2)
- Kotor-class frigate (2)
- Heroj-class submarine (3)
- Sava-class submarine (2)
- Una-class submarine (5)
- Končar-class missile boat (6)
- Osa class missile boat (10)
- Jadran sailboat
- Neštin class minesweeper (7)
- Kozara river ship

== Personnel ==
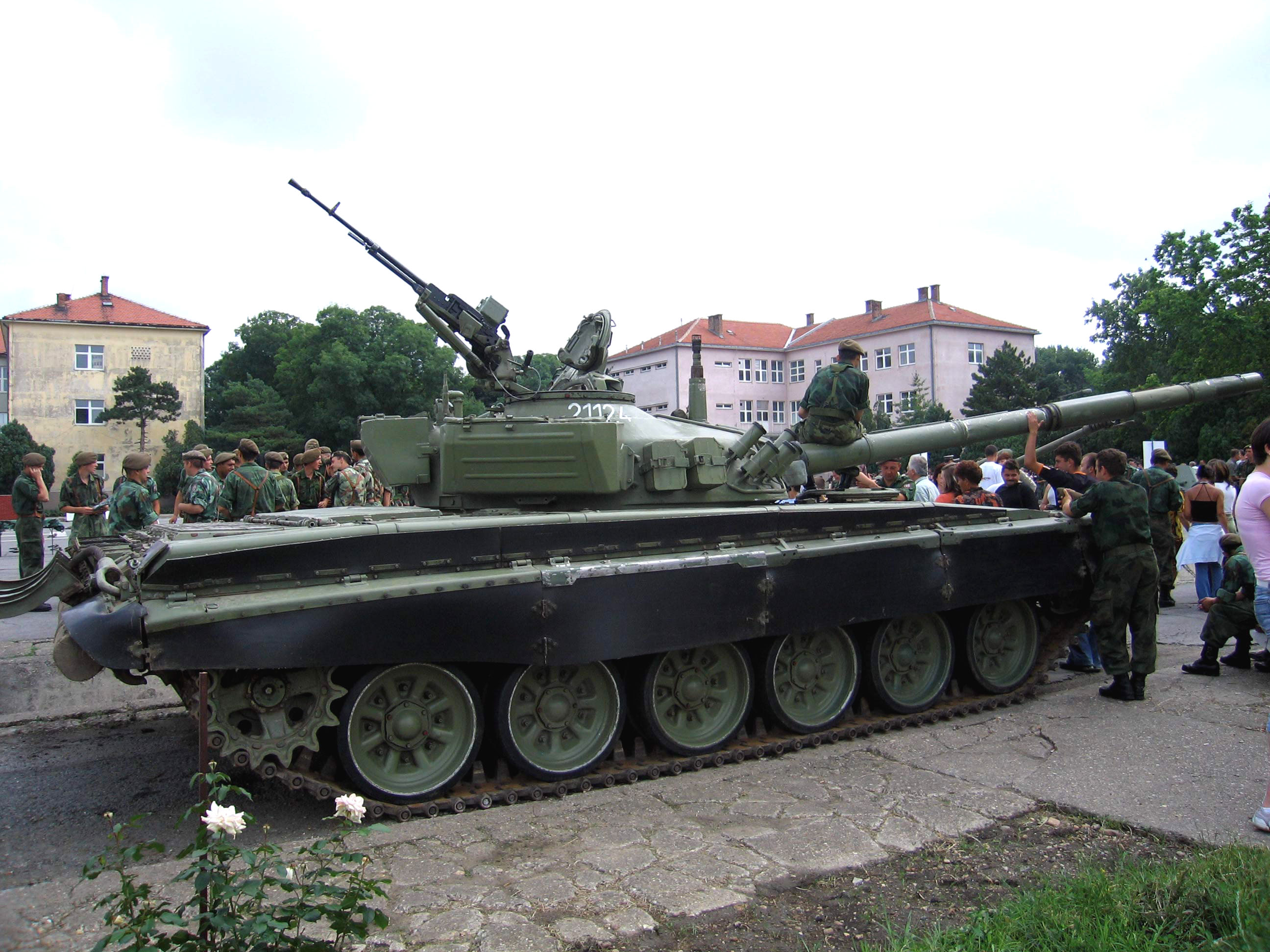
The M-84 Main Battle Tank

Civilians fit for military service were estimated at 4,888,595 (2001 est.). The 2002 estimate for military expenditures as percent of GDP was 4.6%. Significant reforms were undertaken in the military of Serbia and Montenegro. In 2002 the Serbo-Montenegrin Military force numbered around 117,500 soldiers, supported by some 450,000 reserves. The 100,000 strong Army had 1,500 main battle tanks and 687 armed infantry vehicles. The Navy had 3,500 personnel, of whom 900 were marines. The entire Navy was composed totally out of 6 submarines, 3 frigates, 41 patrol & coastal ships and 14 "other" vessels. The Air force 14,000 personnel had 192 combat aircraft and 72 armed helicopters.

== See also ==
- Armed Forces of Montenegro
- Serbian Armed Forces
- Yugoslav People's Army

== Bibliography ==
- Meijer, Hugo; Wyss, Marco (2018). The Handbook of European Defence Policies and Armed Forces. Oxford University Press. ISBN 978-0-19-879050-1.
