= Manastirica =

Manastirica may refer to:

- Manastirica (Kladovo), a village in Serbia
- Manastirica (Petrovac), a village in Serbia
