= Romanian Orthodox Church, Malajnica =

Holy Archangels Michael and Gabriel Romanian Orthodox Church, Malajnica Biserica „Sf. Arhangheli Mihail şi Gavriil” Mălainiţa

Religion
- Affiliation: Romanian Orthodox Church
- District: Bor District
- Region: Timok Valley
- Rite: Eastern Orthodox Church
- Leadership: Bojan Aleksandrović
- Year consecrated: 2004

Location
- Location: Malajnica (Mălainița)
- Municipality: Negotin
- State: Serbia
- Interactive map of Holy Archangels Michael and Gabriel Romanian Orthodox Church, Malajnica; Biserica „Sf. Arhangheli Mihail şi Gavriil” Mălainiţa
- Coordinates: 44.2953°N 22.3856°E

Architecture
- Groundbreaking: 2003
- Completed: 2004
- Height (max): 27 m (89 ft)

The Holy Archangels Michael and Gabriel Romanian Orthodox Church (Romanian: Biserica „Sf. Arhangheli Mihail şi Gavriil” Mălainiţa) is a church in Malajnica (Mălainița), in the Timok Valley, Serbia, consecrated in 2004. It is the first Romanian church in eastern Serbia in 170 years, during which time Romanians in the Timok Valley had not been allowed to hear liturgy services in their native language. It is also a notable topic of Romania–Serbia relations, the church not being recognized by the Serbian authorities.

Bojan Aleksandrović initially tried to seek building permission, approaching Negotin council (to whose jurisdiction the village belongs) in November 2003. Aleksandrović built the church and adjoining rectory in 2004 on his private property and began using it for worship in the autumn of 2004. On 4 December 2004, Bishop Daniil Stoenescu, who then headed the Romanian diocese in Serbia, dedicated the church bells. The Ministry of Foreign Affairs of Romania noted on 10 January 2005 that its embassy in Belgrade had maintained constant contact with Bojan Aleksandrović since the previous month about the fate of his church in Malajnica. But on 20 January 2005, Negotin council issued Bojan Aleksandrović with an order to demolish the church, the belfry and the parish house within 15 days. On 21 January 2005, the day after the demolition order was issued, the Romanian Ministry of Foreign Affairs expressed "deep regret" over the way the local authorities had behaved, especially as planning permission is not required in the village.

The president of Romania Traian Băsescu attended a religious service in the church on 2 November 2011.

== See also ==
- Cathedral of the Ascension of the Lord, Vršac
