= Medveđica =

Medveđica Medvegița (Romanian)
- Village
- Location within Serbia
- Coordinates: 44°13′19″N 21°33′08″E
- Country: Serbia
- District: Braničevo District
- Municipality: Žagubica

Population (2002)
  - Total: 44
- Time zone: UTC+1 (CET)
  - Summer (DST): UTC+2 (CEST)

Medveđica (Romanian: Medvegița) is a village in the municipality of Žagubica, Serbia. According to the 2002 census, the village has a population of 44 people. It is populated by Vlachs.

== Notable people ==
- Safet Pavlović (born 1965), politician and mayor of Žagubica
