= Vlach National Party =

Political party in Serbia

Vlach National Party: Partia Neamului Rumânesc; Влашка народна странка
- Abbreviation: PNR, VNS
- President: Predrag Balašević
- Founded: 25 April 2004; 22 years ago
- Headquarters: Dobrivoja Radosavljevića Bobija 46, Bor
- Ideology: Vlach minority interests; Romanian nationalism
- National affiliation: United Serbia
- Colours: Yellow; Blue
- National Assembly: 0 / 250

Website
- vns.org.rs

The Vlach National Party (Romanian: Partia Neamului Rumânesc or Românesc, PNR; Serbian: Влашка народна странка, romanised: Vlaška narodna stranka, VNS), formerly known as the Vlach Democratic Party of Serbia (Note: Romanian: Partia Democrată a Rumânilor din Serbia or Partidul Democrat al Românilor din Serbia, PDRS; Serbian: Влашке демократске странке Србије, romanised: Vlaške demokratske stranke Srbije, VDSS) until 2013, is a political party in Serbia representing the Vlach minority. The leader of the party is Predrag Balašević, who identifies the Vlachs of the Timok Valley as Romanians and requests minority rights for the Romanian minority in the Timok Valley. The party has contested parliamentary elections on the lists of other parties, most recently on the Serbian Progressive Party-led "Aleksandar Vučić – United Serbia" list in the 2026 parliamentary election. Balašević became deputy mayor of Bor after the 2026 local elections.

== History ==
The Vlach National Party was founded in 2004 with the goal of preserving the culture and identity of the Vlachs, or Timok Romanians, in Serbia. The party collaborates with the Alliance for the Union of Romanians.

The party took part in the 2020 parliamentary election on the "Čedomir Jovanović – Coalition for Peace" list with the Liberal Democratic Party and several minority parties, which won 10,158 votes (0.33%) and no seats. It cooperated with the United for the Victory of Serbia coalition in Bor during the 2022 local elections. In the 2023 parliamentary election, it ran on the "Together for the Future and Development – Coalition for Peace and Tolerance" list, which won 6,786 votes (0.18%) and no seats.

In the 2026 local elections on 29 March, the VNS won one of the 35 seats in the municipal assembly of Bor, and Balašević became deputy mayor following post-election negotiations. The main points of the VNS campaign were the introduction of the Romanian language at the level of public administration in multiple localities and the resolution of problems related to the Romanian Orthodox Church in eastern Serbia and the exercise of religious services in Romanian. In Bor, the party also emphasised environmental protection amid mining activities; as reported by Serbian actress and journalist Jelena Helc, this won the party some voters outside the Vlach Romanian minority. For the 2026 snap parliamentary election, the VNS joined the Serbian Progressive Party-led "Aleksandar Vučić – United Serbia" list.

== See also ==
- Romanians in Serbia
