= Romanians in Serbia =

Românii din Serbia Румуни у Србији
- Ethnic flag of Romanians in Serbia

Total population
- 23,044 (2022)

Regions with significant populations
- Vojvodina: 19,595

Languages
- Romanian and Serbian

Religion
- Eastern Orthodoxy

Romanians are a recognized ethnic minority in Serbia. According to data from the 2022 census, the population of ethnic Romanians in Serbia is 23,044, constituting 0.3% of the total population. An additional 21,013 people self-declared as Vlachs; there are differing views whether Vlachs should be regarded as Romanians or as a distinct ethnicity.

== History ==
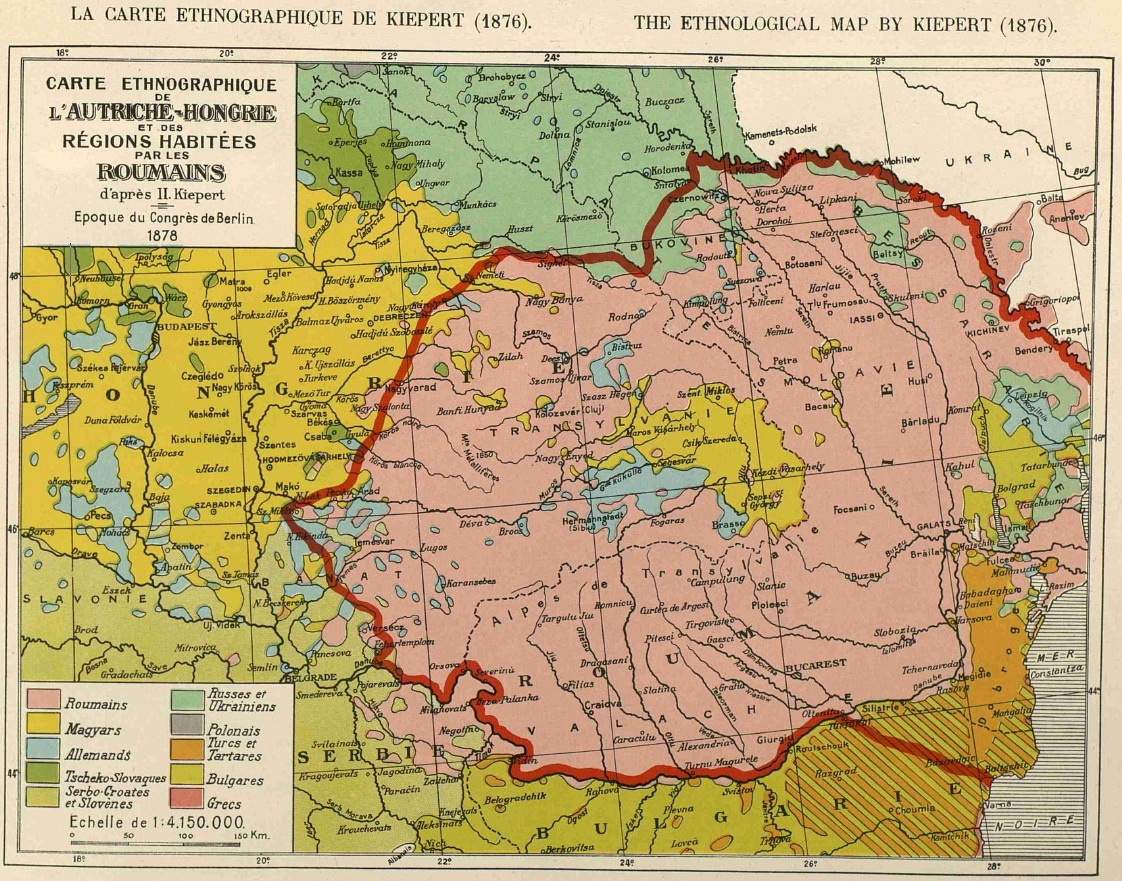
The ethnological map of the Romanian population by Heinrich Kiepert, 1876

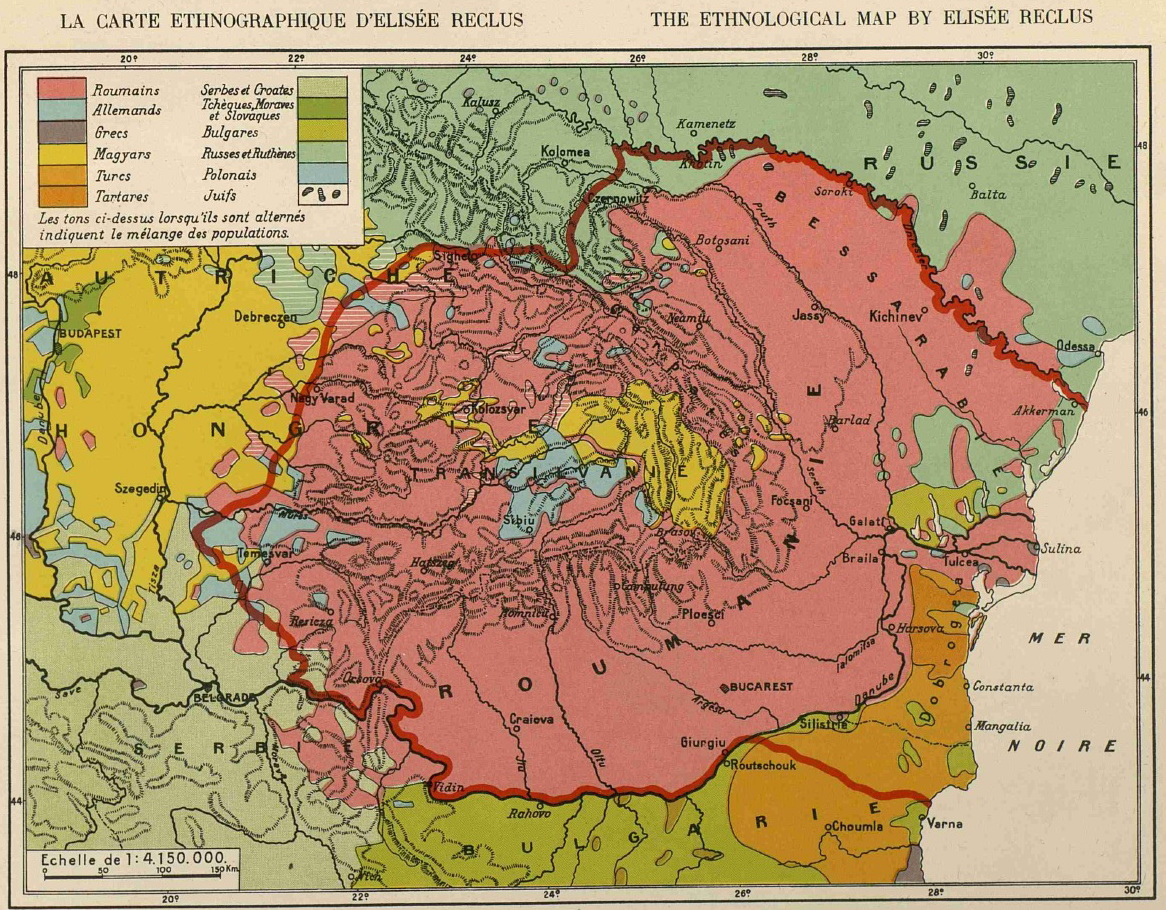
The ethnological map of the Romanian population by Élisée Reclus, 1870

As Daco-Romanian-speakers, the Vlachs have a connection to Roman heritage in Serbia. An area inhabited with Thracian Tribalians, came under Roman control in 75 BC, when Roman province Moesia was established. Following Roman withdrawal from the province of Dacia at the end of the 3rd century, the name of the Roman region was changed to Dacia Aureliana, and (later Dacia Ripensis) spread over most of what are now Serbia and Bulgaria. Roman military presence in the region persisted through the end of Justinian's reign in the 6th century.

The region where Vlachs predominantly live later on was part of the Second Bulgarian Empire, whose first rulers, the Asens, were possibly of Vlach origin. King Stefan Uroš II Milutin of Serbia had Braničevo region conquered from local rulers Darman and Kudelin in 1291, while Timok Valley remained independent state until Ottoman arrival at the end of 14th century. The chroniclers of the crusaders describe presence of Vlachs in the 12th and 13th century in various parts of modern Serbia. Serbian documents from the 13th and 14th century mention Vlachs, including Emperor Stefan Dušan, in his prohibition of intermarriage between Serbs and Vlachs. In 14th and 15th century Romanian (Wallachian) rulers built churches in eastern Serbia: Lapuṣna, Coroglaṣ, Krepičevac, Vratna, Bucovo, Manastirica, and Lozuca. Ottoman records list Vlachs in the region of Braničevo, near the ancient Roman municipium and colonia of Viminacium.

Starting in the early 18th century, eastern Serbia was settled by Romanians (then known by their international exonym as Vlachs) from Banat, parts of Transylvania, and Oltenia (Lesser Walachia). These are the Ungureni (Ungurjani), Munteni (Munćani), and Bufeni (Bufani). Today about three quarters of the Vlach population speak the Ungurean subdialect. In the 19th century other groups of Romanians, originating in Oltenia (Lesser Wallachia), also settled south of the Danube. These are the Țărani (Carani), who form some 25% of the modern population. The very name Țărani indicates their origin in Țara Românească, i.e., "The Romanian Land", that is, Wallachia (Oltenia and Muntenia). From the 15th through the 18th centuries large numbers of Serbs also migrated across the Danube, but in the opposite direction, to both Banat and Țara Româneasca. Significant migration ended with the establishment of the kingdoms of Serbia and Romania, respectively, in the second half of the 19th century.

In a Romanian-Yugoslav agreement of 2002, the Yugoslav authorities agreed to recognize the Romanian identity of the Vlach population in eastern Serbia, but the agreement was not implemented. In 2005, many deputies from the Council of Europe protested against the position of this population in Serbia. In 2007, Vlachs were officially recognized as ethnic minority, while their language was recognized as Romanian.

== Demographics ==
According to data from the 2022 census, the population of ethnic Romanians in Serbia is 23,044, constituting 0.3% of the total population, while 21,013 people declared themselves Vlachs. Ethnic Romanians are mostly concentrated in Banat, while self-declared Vlachs in the Timok Valley.

Year	Romanians	Share	Vlachs	Share
1856	104,343	16.8%		
1859	122,593	14.4%		
1866	127,545	10.5%		
1884	149,727	7.8%		
1890	143,684	6.6%		
1895	159,510	6.4%		
1900	122,429	4.9%		
1921	224,746	4.7%		
1931	130,635	2.3%		
1948	63,130	0.9%	93,440	1.6%
1953	59,705	0.8%	28,407	0.4%
1961	59,505	0.8%	1,330	0.02%
1971	57,419	0.7%	14,724	0.1%
1981	53,693	0.6%	25,596	0.2%
1991	42,331	0.4%	17,807	0.2%
2002	34,576	0.4%	40,054	0.5%
2011	29,332	0.4%	35,330	0.5%
2022	23,044	0.3%	21,013	0.3%

=== Banat ===
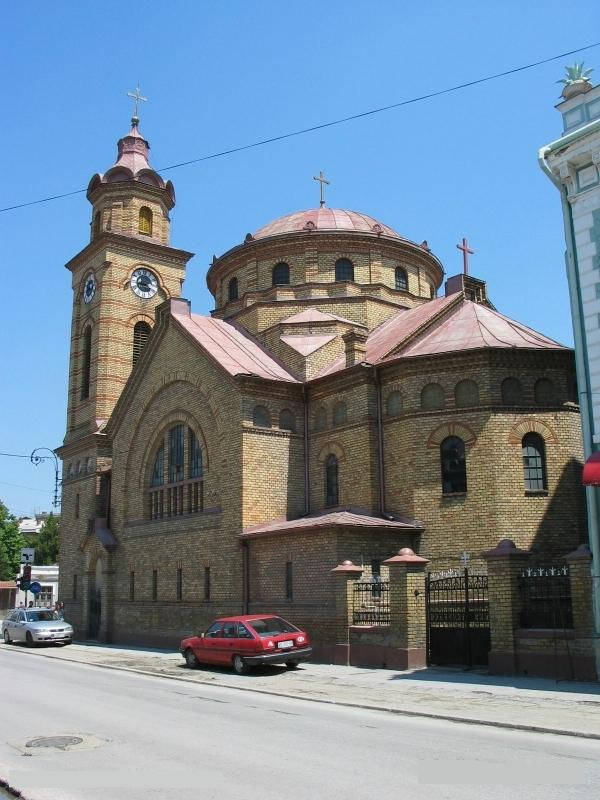
Romanian Orthodox Cathedral of the Ascension of the Lord in Vršac

The largest concentration of ethnic Romanians in Serbia are to be found in Banat numbering 17,262 people or three-fourths of country's Romanian community.

Settlements in the Serbian Banat with Romanian ethnic majority are:

- Lokve (Alibunar municipality)
- Nikolinci (Alibunar municipality)
- Uzdin (Kovačica municipality)
- Torak (Žitište municipality)
- Grebenac (Bela Crkva municipality)
- Kuštilj (City of Vršac)
- Straža (City of Vršac)
- Ritiševo (City of Vršac)
- Vojvodinci (City of Vršac)
- Mesić (City of Vršac)
- Markovac (City of Vršac)
- Jablanka (City of Vršac)
- Sočica (City of Vršac)
- Barice (Plandište municipality)

Settlements in the Serbian Banat with Romanian ethnic plurality are:

- Jankov Most (City of Zrenjanin)
- Mali Žam (City of Vršac)
- Malo Središte (City of Vršac)

=== Timok Valley ===
Although ethnographically and linguistically closely related to the Romanians, there are divergences on whether or not they belong to the Romanian ethnicity and whether or not their minority should be amalgamated with the Romanian ethnic minority in Serbia. The Serbian state considers Vlachs a distinct ethnic minority rejecting any conflation with the Romanians, citing census results and their right of self-identification with the ethnicity of their choice. On the other hand, Romania's stance is that the Vlachs are Romanians, claiming the split between "Romanian" and "Vlach" identities as artificial and accusing Serbia of failing to protect the ethnic minority rights of the Romanians in Timok Valley.

Vlachs settled in Timok Valley from regions north of the Danube by the Habsburgs at the beginning of the 18th century. The origins of these Vlachs are indicated by their own self-designations: "Ungurean/Ungureni" (Ungurjani), i.e. those who came from Hungary (that is, Banat and Transylvania) and "Țărani" (Carani), who came from Wallachia (Romanian: Țara Românească – "Romanian Country"). The second wave of Vlachs from present-day Romania came in the middle of the 19th century. In 1835, feudalism was fully abolished in the Principality of Serbia and smaller groups from Wallachia migrated to enjoy the status of free peasants.

== Politics ==
The National Council of the Romanian National Minority is a representation body of the Romanian ethnic minority in Serbia, established for the protection of the rights and the minority self-government of Romanians in Serbia.

== Culture ==
Romanian is one of six official languages of the provincial administration in Vojvodina and ethnic Romanians have access to education in their native language.

Most of the Romanians in Serbia are Eastern Orthodox, belonging to the Romanian Orthodox Church (through its diocese of Dacia Felix).

Libertatea is a Romanian language-weekly newspaper, published in Pančevo.

== Notable people ==
- Bojan Aleksandrović (born 1977), priest
- Predrag Balašević (born 1974), politician
- Alexandru Butoarcă (1898–1980), lawyer and activist
- Paun Es Durlić (born 1949), ethnologist
- Raimond Gaita (born 1946), philosopher
- Ilija Lupulesku (born 1967), table tennis player
- Maria of Yugoslavia (1900–1961), Queen consort of Yugoslavia
- Miletić Mihajlović (born 1951), politician
- Ion Miloș (1930–2015), poet and translator
- Natalie of Serbia (1859–1941), Queen consort of Serbia
- Safet Pavlović (born 1965), politician
- Dușan Pârvulovici (born 1966), minority rights activist
- Emil Petrovici (1899–1968), linguist
- Vasko Popa (1922–1991), poet
- Adam Puslojić (1943–2022), poet, translator and writer
- Atanasie Popovici (c. 1887–1958), schoolteacher, minority rights activist and irredentist
- Cristea Sandu Timoc (1916–2012), writer, historian and folklorist
- Lazăr Sfera (1909–1992), football player
- Marinika Tepić (born 1974), politician

== See also ==
- Vlachs of Serbia
- Vlachs in medieval Serbia
- Romania–Serbia relations
