= Osanica =

Osanica may refer to:

== Places ==
- Osanica, village in the municipality of Goražde, Bosnia and Herzegovina
- Osanica, village in the municipality of Žagubica, Serbia
