= Starčevo (Petrovac) =

Starčevo Старчево Starcevo
- Village
- Location within Serbia
- Coordinates: 44°27′50″N 21°24′04″E
- Country: Serbia
- District: Braničevo District
- Municipality: Petrovac na Mlavi

Population (2022)
  - Total: 331
- Time zone: UTC+1 (CET)
  - Summer (DST): UTC+2 (CEST)

Starčevo (Serbian: Старчево; Romanian: Starcevo) is a village situated in Petrovac municipality in Serbia. It has a population of 331 inhabitants (2022 census), a plurality of them Vlachs.
