= Miletić Mihajlović =

Serbian politician

Miletić Mihajlović Tića (Serbian Cyrillic: Милетић Михајловић Тића; born 1 October 1951) is a politician in Serbia of Timok Vlach ethnicity. He has served in the National Assembly of Serbia since 2007 as a member of the Socialist Party of Serbia. He is since 2010 a member of the National Council of the Vlach National Minority representing the Timok Vlachs.

== Early life and career ==
Mihajlović was born in Petrovac na Mlavi, in what was then the People's Republic of Serbia in the Federal People's Republic of Yugoslavia. He graduated from teacher's college and from the University of Belgrade, worked as a professor, and was director of the Petrovac Gymnasium from 1991 to 2001. He is currently president of the supervisory board of the Svetozar Marković Fund.

== Political career ==
=== Socialist Party leadership and municipal politics ===
Mihajlović was vice-president of the Socialist Party's municipal committee in Petrovac na Mlavi from 1990 to 1992. He later became president of the committee from 2002 to 2004, returned to the presidency in 2006, and continues to serve in this role as of 2017. He has also served as president of the Socialist Party's district committee for Braničevo District; in this capacity, he oversaw some aspects of Slobodan Milošević's funeral ceremonies in the former Serbian president's hometown of Požarevac in 2006.

He was a member of the main board of the Socialist Party at the national level from 2002 and 2004 and subsequently returned to the position in 2006. He was elected to the party's presidency in 2012.

Mihajlović has been politically active at the municipal level and was selected as president of the municipal assembly of Petrovac na Mlavi in 2004.

=== National Assembly of Serbia ===
Mihajlović received the 147th position on the Socialist Party's electoral list (which was largely arranged in alphabetical order) in the 2007 Serbian parliamentary election. The party won sixteen seats, and Mihajlović was selected as part of its assembly delegation. (From 2000 to 2011, Serbian parliamentary mandates were awarded to sponsoring parties or coalitions rather than to individual candidates, and it was common practice for mandates to be awarded out of numerical order. Mihajlović's low position did not prevent him from receiving a mandate.) He received the 153rd position on the list (which was again mostly alphabetical) in the 2008 election and was again chosen to serve in the assembly when the Socialist Party and its allies won twenty seats.

Serbia's electoral system was reformed in 2011, such that parliamentary mandates were awarded in numerical order to candidates on successful lists. Mihajlović was re-elected in the 2012, 2014, and 2016 elections, in each case after receiving relatively high list positions. He is currently a member of the assembly committee on the judiciary, public administration, and local self-government; a member of the committee on education, science, technological development, and the information society; a deputy member of three other committees; a deputy member of Serbia's delegation to the NATO Parliamentary Assembly (where Serbia has associate membership); the leader of Serbia's parliamentary friendship group with Romania; and a member of the parliamentary friendship groups with Belarus, France, Ireland, Kazakhstan, Spain, and Switzerland.

The Socialist Party of Serbia has been part of the government of Serbia since 2008. Apart from his first term in the assembly, when he was an opposition member, Mihajlović served with the government's parliamentary majority.

=== National Council of the Vlach National Minority ===
Mihajlović is a Timok Vlach. He was elected to the National Council of the Vlach National Minority in 2010 as the leader of the Vlasi za Srbiju - Srbija za Vlahe list; in this campaign, he opposed what he described as efforts by the government of Romania to influence Vlach affairs in Serbia. He subsequently served as deputy chair of the council. He was re-elected in 2014, after receiving the second position on the Vlasi za Srbiju - Srbija za Vlahe list.
