= Safet Pavlović =

Serbian politician

- Сафет Павловић
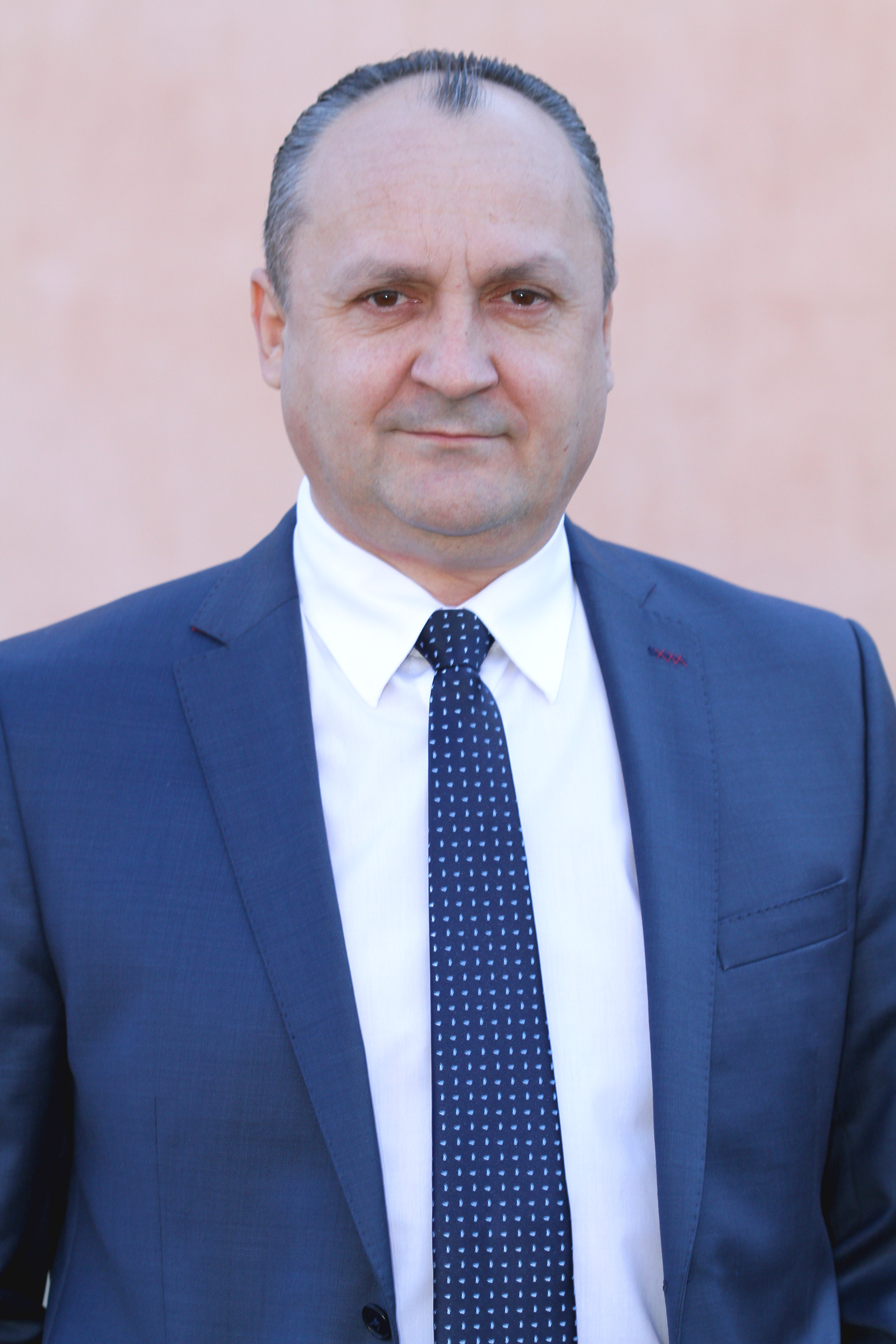

Mayor of Žagubica
- Incumbent
- Assumed office 22 March 2013
- Preceded by: Saša Ognjanović

Personal details
- Born: 18 June 1965 (age 61) Medveđica, SR Serbia, SFR Yugoslavia
- Party: SPS (2008–2015); SNS (2015–present)
- Education: Faculty of Management in Zaječar

Safet Pavlović (Serbian Cyrillic: Сафет Павловић; born 18 June 1965) is a Serbian politician serving as the mayor of Žagubica since 2013. A former member of the Socialist Party of Serbia (SPS), he is now a member of the Serbian Progressive Party (SNS).

== Early life and education ==
Pavlović was born on 18 June 1965 in Medveđica, SR Serbia, SFR Yugoslavia. He is an ethnic Vlach. He graduated from the Faculty of Management in Zaječar in 2007, majoring in banking, finance and stock market management.

== Political career ==
He started his political career in 2008 as a member of the Socialist Party of Serbia (SPS) and was the president of its branch in Žagubica. He participated in the elections for the National Council of the Vlach National Minority. Pavlović served as the assistant to the mayor of Žagubica. Since 22 March 2013, he has been serving as the mayor of Žagubica, He joined the Serbian Progressive Party (SNS) in 2015. He was re-elected mayor in 2016 and 2020.

== Controversies ==
In 1994, Pavlović was arrested for falsifying documents. In 2002, as an owner of a night club, Pavlović was arrested for mediation in prostitution after a Moldovan and Romanian woman, suspected of prostitution, were found in his night club. In December 2022, Pavlović threatened an environmental activist, telling him that if "someone hits on my name, then we cut you". In April 2023, during an environmental protest in Žagubica, Pavlović was provoking the protesters by sending them kisses and eventually physically attacking MPs Aleksandar Jovanović Ćuta and Radmila Vasić.
