= Busur =

Busur Бусур Busur
- Village
- Location within Serbia
- Coordinates: 44°13′30″N 21°23′07″E
- Country: Serbia
- District: Braničevo
- Municipality: Petrovac na Mlavi

Population (2022)
  - Total: 815
- Time zone: UTC+1 (CET)
  - Summer (DST): UTC+2 (CEST)

Busur (Serbian: Бусур; Romanian: Busur) is a village located in Petrovac municipality, Braničevo District, Serbia. It has a population of 815 inhabitants (2022 census), a majority of them Vlachs.
