= Bojan Aleksandrović =

Romanian priest

- Boian Alexandrovici
- Born: 5 January 1977 (age 49); Negotin, Serbia
- Other names: Boian Alexandrovici, Boian Alexandru
- Occupation: Priest
- Employer: Romanian Orthodox Church
- Known for: Romanian Orthodox Church, Malajnica
- Awards: Order of Cultural Merit

Bojan Aleksandrović (Romanian: Boian Alexandrovici, born 5 January 1977) is a Timok Vlach/Romanian priest who in 2004 successfully defied the Serbian authorities to build a Romanian Orthodox church in Malajnica (Mălainița), the first Romanian Orthodox Church in the Timok Valley in two centuries. He has since established at least four other sites for future churches. Aleksandrović is pastor of the Romanian Orthodox community in Malajnica and Remesiana, Serbia, and protopresbyter of Dacia Ripensis.

On 27 May 2013, Aleksandrović was awarded the Clujean de Onoare ("Honorary Clujean") title, making him an honorary citizen of Romania's Cluj County, for his efforts in promoting the cultural, linguistic and religious identity of the Romanians in Serbia.

== Awards ==
- Order of Cultural Merit

== See also ==
- Diocese of Dacia Felix
