= Podgorac, Boljevac =

Podgorac Подгорац (Serbian) Podgorț (Romanian)
- Village
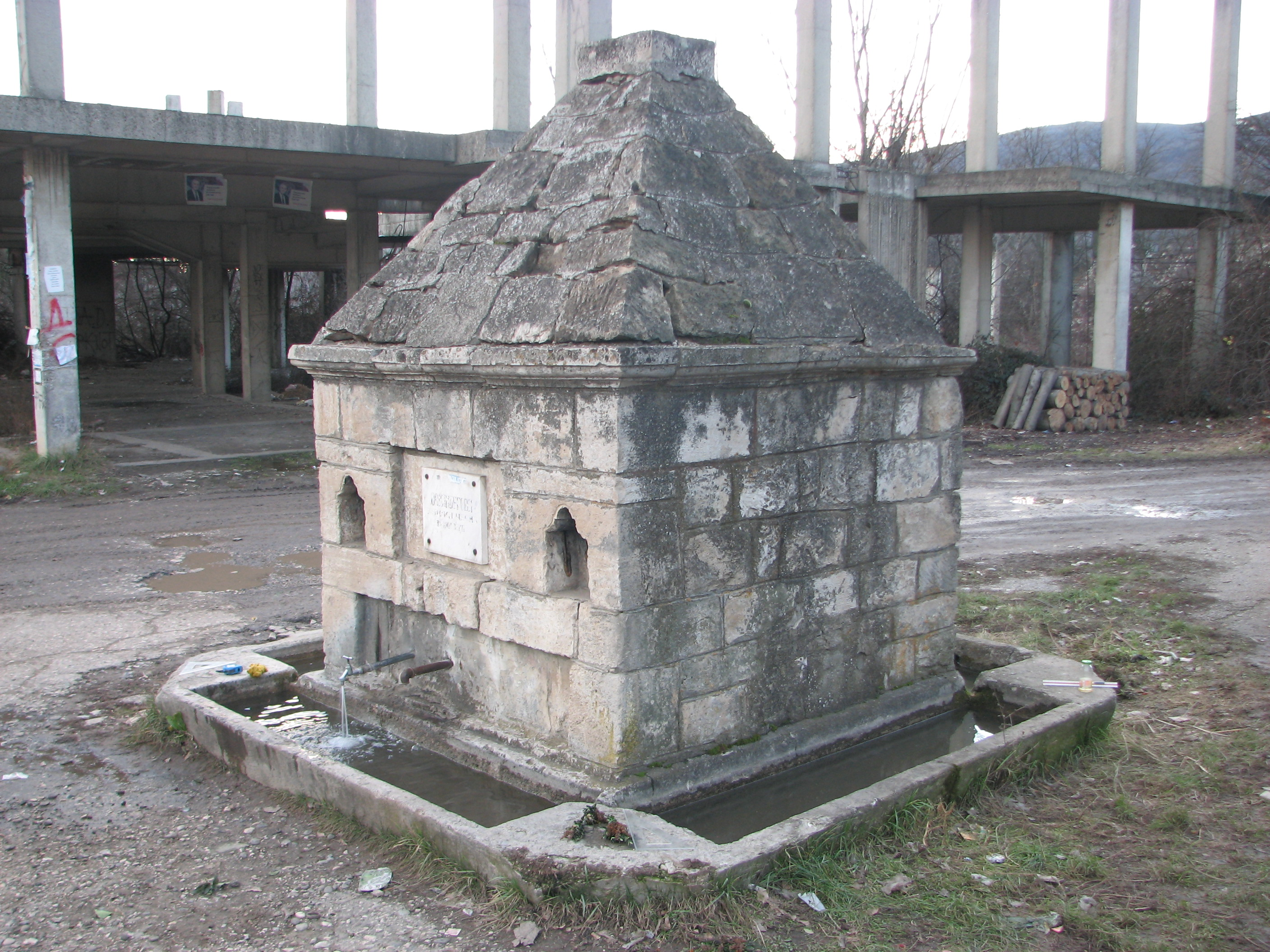
- Osman Bey's Fountain

- Location within Serbia
- Coordinates: 43°56′39″N 21°56′42″E
- Country: Serbia
- District: Zaječar District
- Municipality: Boljevac

Population (2002)
  - Total: 2,218
- Time zone: UTC+1 (CET)
  - Summer (DST): UTC+2 (CEST)

Podgorac (Serbian Cyrillic: Подгорац; Romanian: Podgorț) is a village in the municipality of Boljevac, Serbia. According to the 2002 census, the village has a population of 2218 people. The village is situated in the Crna Reka region.

There is an 18th-century Ottoman Turkish public fountain built with the funds donated by a certain Osman Bey and therefore named (in Serbian) Osmanbegova česma.

The village was a site of operations in the First Serbian Uprising (1804–13). The Crna Reka nahija was organized into Revolutionary Serbia, with a seat at Zaječar and the establishment of a magistrate (court). A Serbian military camp was located at Podgorac.

For a brief period in 1840/41 school year, Đura Jakšić was a village school teacher here.

== Notable people ==
- Predrag Balašević (born 1974), Timok Vlach politician

== Sources ==
- Jovanović, Dragoljub K. (1883). "Црна река". Glasnik Srpskog učenog društva. 54: 187–256.
- Nenadović, Konstantin N. (1884). Живот и дела великог Ђорђа Петровића Кара-Ђорђа. Vol. II (1 ed.). Vienna: У Штампарији Јована Н. Вернаја – via Google Books.
- Protić, Kosta (1893). "Ратни догађаји из првога српског устанка под Карађорђем Петровићем 1804—1813". Годишњица Николе Чупића. XIII. Državna štamparija.
