= Predrag Balašević =

Serbian politician of Romanian ethnicity

- Предраг Балашевић; Predrag Balașevici

Personal details
- Born: 5 January 1974 (age 52) Podgorac, SR Serbia, SFR Yugoslavia
- Party: Vlach National Party (2004–present)

Predrag Balašević (Romanian: Predrag Balașevici, Serbian Cyrillic: Предраг Балашевић) is a Serbian politician of Timok Vlach ethnicity who is currently the leader of the Vlach National Party.

== Biography ==
Predrag Balašević was born on 5 January 1974 in Podgorac (Romanian: Podgorț), in the region of the Timok Valley in Yugoslavia (now Serbia). He created the Vlach National Party on 25 April 2004 in Bor to defend the rights of Timok Vlachs of Serbia. In 2008, he led the political coalition United Vlachs of Serbia formed between the Vlach National Party and two other Vlach parties. This was done with the intention of participating in the 2008 Serbian parliamentary election. For doing this, 10,516 signatures showing support to the coalition were submitted. The coalition presented 171 candidates in the elections.

Balašević has reported that the lack of education in the Romanian language in the Timok Valley is "dramatic" and endangers the survival of the community, demanding help from Romania and comparing the situation with the support that Hungary brings to its diaspora. On 2020, he participated in the 2020 Serbian parliamentary election, saying that this election was an important opportunity for a representative of the estimated around 330,000-strong Romanian minority in Serbia to enter the Parliament of Serbia for the first time. Balašević also thanked George Simion and his Romanian party Alliance for the Union of Romanians (AUR) for supporting him during the elections, with AUR being the only party from Romania that did this.
