= Beljajka =

Coordinates: 44°03′36″N 21°26′31″E

Beljajka Бељајка Belaica
- Village
- Interactive map of Beljajka
- Country: Serbia

Population (2022)
  - Total: 180
- Time zone: UTC+1 (CET)
  - Summer (DST): UTC+2 (CEST)

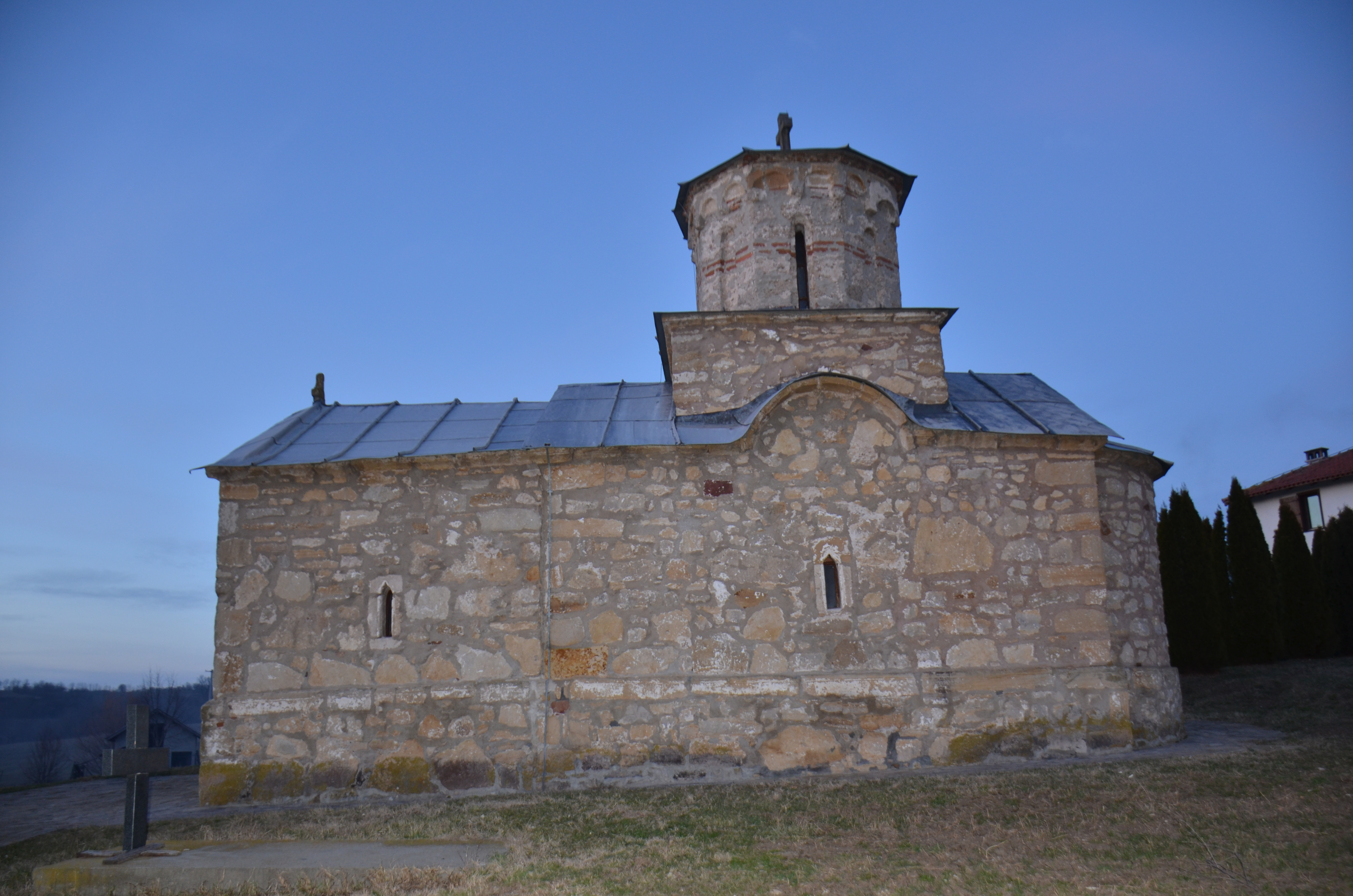
Monastery of the Nativity of the Blessed Virgin Mary - White Church, village of Beljajka, Municipality of Despotovac, Pomoravski District

Beljajka (Serbian Cyrillic: Бељајка; Romanian: Belaica) is a village situated in Despotovac municipality in Serbia. It has a population of 180 inhabitants (2022 census), a plurality of them Vlachs.
