= Krivača, Golubac =

Krivača Кривача Crivacea
- Village
- Location within Serbia
- Coordinates: 44°36′06″N 21°40′51″E
- Country: Serbia
- District: Braničevo District
- Municipality: Golubac

Population (2022)
  - Total: 257
- Time zone: UTC+1 (CET)
  - Summer (DST): UTC+2 (CEST)

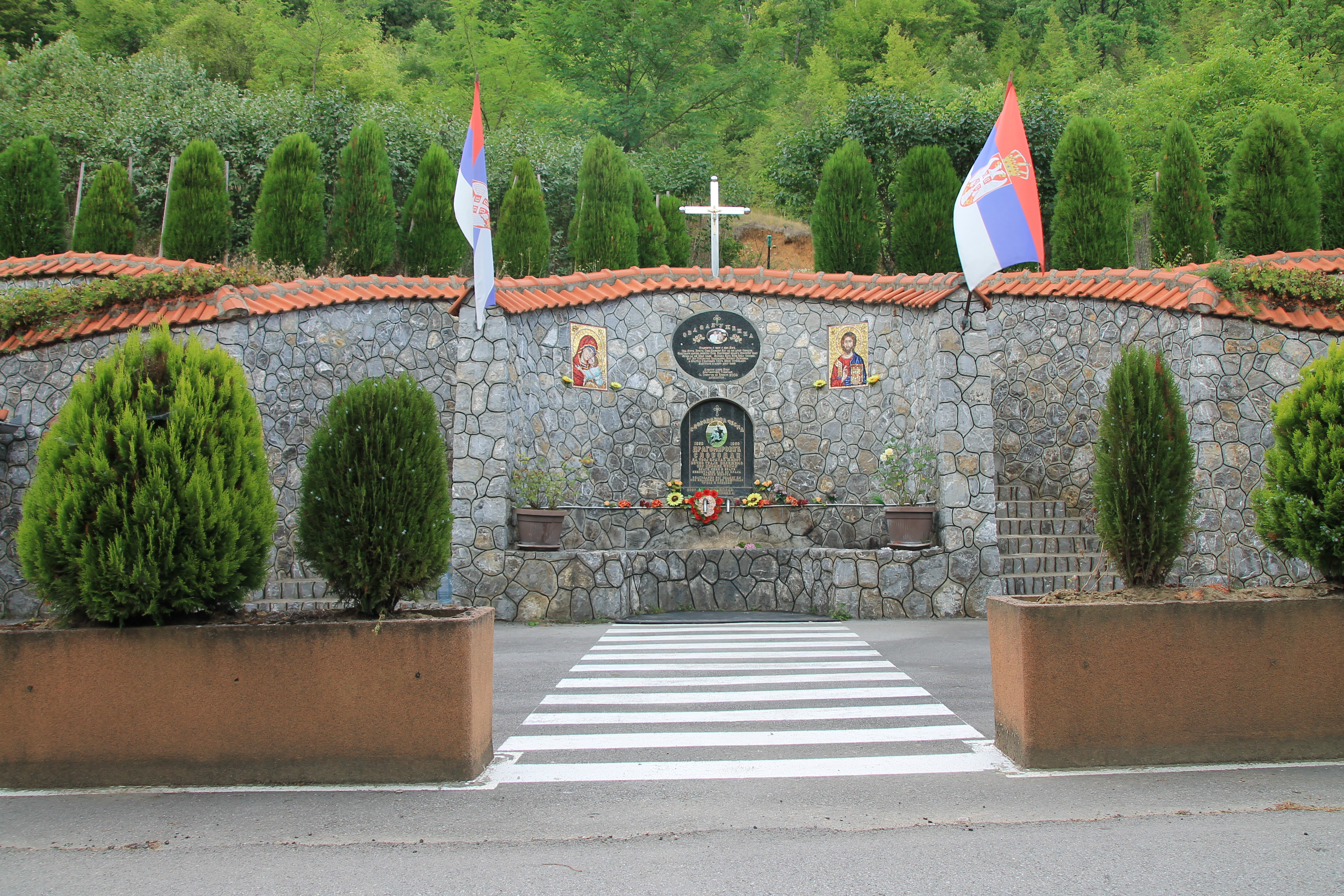

Krivača (Serbian: Кривача; Romanian: Crivacea) is a village in the municipality of Golubac, Serbia. It has a population of 257 inhabitants (2022 census), a majority of them Vlachs.
