= Vlachs of Serbia =

Romanian-speaking population in Serbia

Rumâńii din Serbia Власи у Србији
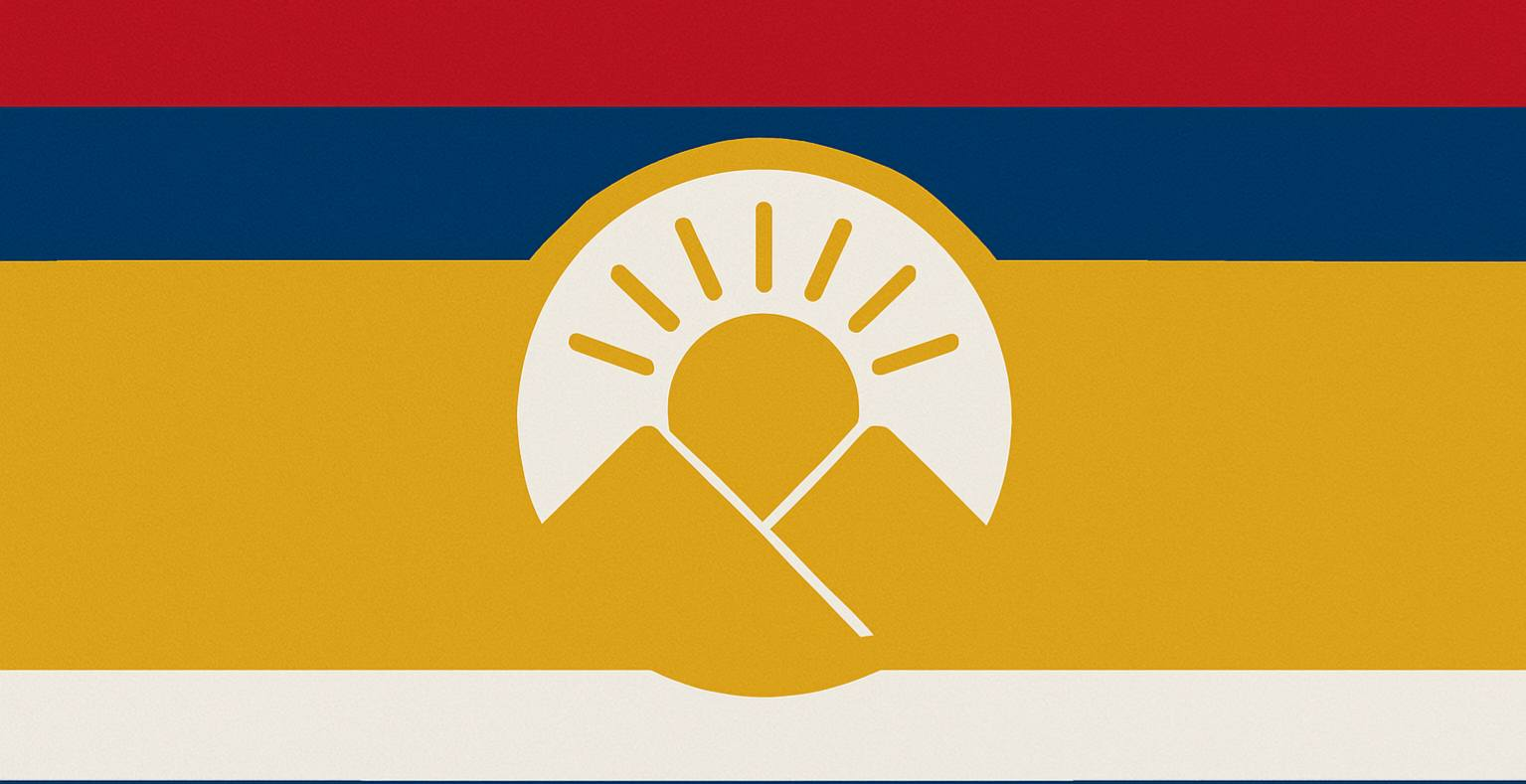
- Ethnic flag of the Vlachs of Serbia, as adopted by the Vlach National Council

Total population
- 21,013 (2022) 150,000–300,000 (est.)

Regions with significant populations
- Bor District: 8,190
- Braničevo District: 8,040
- Zaječar District: 3,146
- Pomoravlje District: 830

Languages
- Romanian and Serbian

Religion
- Eastern Orthodoxy

Related ethnic groups
- Romanians

The Vlachs (Romanian: rumâń; Serbian: Власи, romanized: Vlasi) are a recognized ethnic minority in Serbia. According to data from the 2022 census, there were 21,013 Vlachs living in Serbia (constituting 0.3% of the total population), although unofficial estimates by members of the community range from 150,000 to 300,000. They are concentrated primarily in the Timok Valley, and speak an archaic variety of the Romanian language alongside the official Serbian.

The Vlachs are characterized by a culture that has preserved ancient elements in matters such as language or customs. Although ethnographically and linguistically related to the Romanians, within the Vlach community there are divergences on whether or not they belong to the Romanian ethnicity and whether or not their minority should be amalgamated with the Romanian ethnic minority in Serbia.

== History ==
"Vlach" is a word of Germanic origin, originally used by the Germanic tribes to refer to the Romans. It would later be adopted by the Byzantine Empire, the Ottoman Empire and virtually all Slavs to refer to the Romance languages-speakers in the Balkans that remained following the various migrations into the area. These peoples never referred to themselves as "Vlachs", but as some variant of "Roman". Today there are several peoples that are still commonly referred to as Vlachs, these including the Vlachs of eastern Serbia.

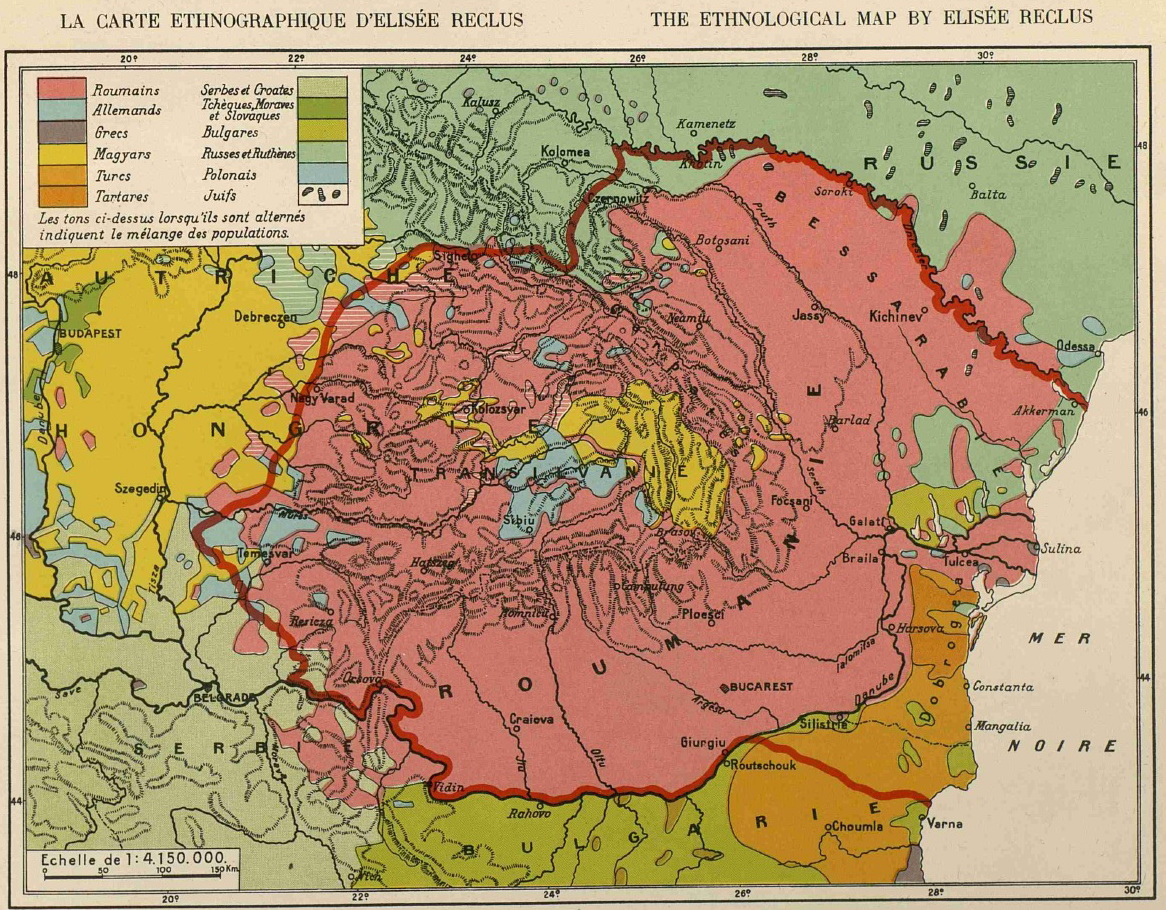
The ethnological map of the Romanian population by Élisée Reclus, 1870

There are hypotheses about an autochthonous origin of the Vlachs in the area in which they currently live. Such an idea was supported by Vlach schoolteacher, minority rights activist and Romanian irredentist Atanasie Popovici. However, most researchers agree that the Vlachs of eastern Serbia originate from areas in present-day Romania and settled in land in which they live today as a result of migrations in the 18th and 19th centuries. These migrations occurred due to the difficult living conditions in Hungary, Moldavia, and Wallachia. Strong migrations were recorded between 1718 and 1739 after the Austro-Turkish War of 1716–1718; during this time, eastern Serbia was part of the Banat of Temeswar. Migrations to eastern Serbia continued after this period, albeit on a smaller scale. More precisely, migrations were recorded in the periods of 1723–1725, 1733–1734, 1818 and 1834. These were directed to the settlements of Jošanica, Krepoljin, Laznica (Laznița), Osanica (Osanița), Ribare, Suvi Do, Vukovac, Žagubica (Jagubița or Jăgobița). These migrations increased the number of houses in the area around the Homolje Mountains (Serbian: Хомољске планине; Romanian: Munții Homolie or Munții Homoliei) from 80 in 1718 to 155 in 1733. Furthermore, the two latter waves led to the foundation of the settlements of Bliznak, Breznica, Izvarica, Jasikovo, Krupaja, Milanovac, and Sige. According to the place of origin of these new migrants, the Vlachs of eastern Serbia were divided into ungureni (originating from the Kingdom of Hungary, or more precisely, from Banat and Transylvania proper) and țărani (originating from Moldavia and Wallachia). The Vlachs are still divided into these two groups according to the Romanian dialect they speak; the ungureni have a speech closely related to the Banat Romanian dialect while the dialect of the țărani is closer to the Wallachian one. Dialectally, there are two other groups of Vlachs, the munteni and the bufani, but these are largely assimilated into the former two.

Before the unification of Moldavia and Wallachia in 1859, the Vlachs in eastern Serbia were officially known as "Romanians". On the other hand, the country of Wallachia (the name of which was derived from "Vlach"), was known in Serbian as "Vlaška". Furthermore, in ethnographic studies of the 19th or early 20th century, the Vlachs of eastern Serbia were regarded as Romanians in an undisputed way. However, after 1859 and the formation of the first modern Romanian state, this practice was reversed, with the name of "Vlach" being imposed over on the community of eastern Serbia to break similarities with the Romanians; this was intensified after the creation of Yugoslavia.

The alleged 'assimilative power' of the Vlachs in eastern Serbia, as well as their resistance to assimilation, was also written about by Tihomir Đorđević at the beginning of the 20th century. He attributed to the Vlachs an 'inherent hatred toward other ethnicities, including Serbs.' As for other ethnicities, their existence was not denied as such, but they were deprived of minority rights. This applied primarily to the Vlachs of northeastern Serbia and to the small number of Aromanians in Macedonia. Regarding the Vlachs in Serbia, the prevailing opinion was still that they were not only resistant to assimilation, but that they were also assimilating the surrounding Serbs, thereby expanding the reach of their own ethnic group. For political reasons, they were denied a Romanian ethnic consciousness.

Between 1945 and 1949, the People's Front of Yugoslavia's Zaječar (Zaicear) branch published as its official organ Vorba noastră ("Our Word"), the first publication in the Vlachs' local Romanian variant, written by Vlachs for their own community. Written in Cyrillic, Vorba noastră had 40 issues of it published. According to an article by Ivan Miladinović for Večernje novosti, at the end of 1946, Yugoslav Partisans leader Josip Broz Tito presented a proposal to allow Romania to annex the Vlach-populated areas in eastern Serbia since "Romanian comrades, Gheorghiu-Dej and Ana Pauker, think it is their people and their territory"; Secretary of the Central Committee of the Communist Party of Serbia, Blagoje Nešković, would have expressed strong opposition to this proposal.

=== Historical references ===
On the Balkan Peninsula, within medieval feudal states, the assimilation of the older pre-Slavic population—Illyrian in the west, Daco-Thracian romanized population in the east—took place. Over time, under the socio-economic conditions of that era, these people evolved from ethnic Vlachs into a distinct social class of Slavic livestock herders known as vlachs, settled in permanent, predominantly mountainous communities. Given the uneven socio-economic conditions across different parts of the Balkans—a feature particularly characteristic of both Serbian and later Ottoman feudalism—this process was neither uniform everywhere nor was it completed everywhere. In the northern regions of Serbia, where Serbian feudalism never established state-building centers capable of shaping overall cultural development, this process continued into the era of Ottoman feudalism. Because autonomous territories with local self-governance under direct sultanic authority existed within this system, these autonomous regions held special importance for the still primitive Vlach population, whom the Ottoman authorities encountered along their assimilative ethnic boundary. Serving the sultan, this population carried specific duties (such as martoloses and soldiers) alongside considerable rights. Beyond historical records, a vibrant oral tradition regarding the status of this population in eastern Serbia persists to this day.

Given that the region of Eastern Serbia lies near the so-called northern Balkan ethnic Romance core, the process of complete Vlach ethnic integration with the Serbian population was slowed down by the subsequent immigration of fresh Romance-speaking populations (Ungureani, Țărani) from the north during the 17th, 18th, and 19th centuries, and possibly from the south, particularly during the first decades of Ottoman rule. Furthermore, this area is geographically and culturally tied to the Carpathian region, a key defining characteristic of which is a population that, by genesis, partly originates from a very early Thracian-Dacian-Slavic symbiosis. In that area, the Danube was no barrier to migration for the entire Carpathian population, as evidenced by recent Serbian archival data. Consequently, since Eastern Serbia forms an integral part of this broader geographical and cultural area, its present-day Vlach population—along with a portion of the Serbian population (the native inhabitants)—would essentially be indigenous in the broadest sense of the word. The only difference is that through migrations both within the area as a whole and into its narrower sub-regions, they settled across various historical periods. Thus, the Vlach settlement in Eastern Serbia represents an internal population movement within the wider Carpathian-Balkan region, driven by historical circumstances.

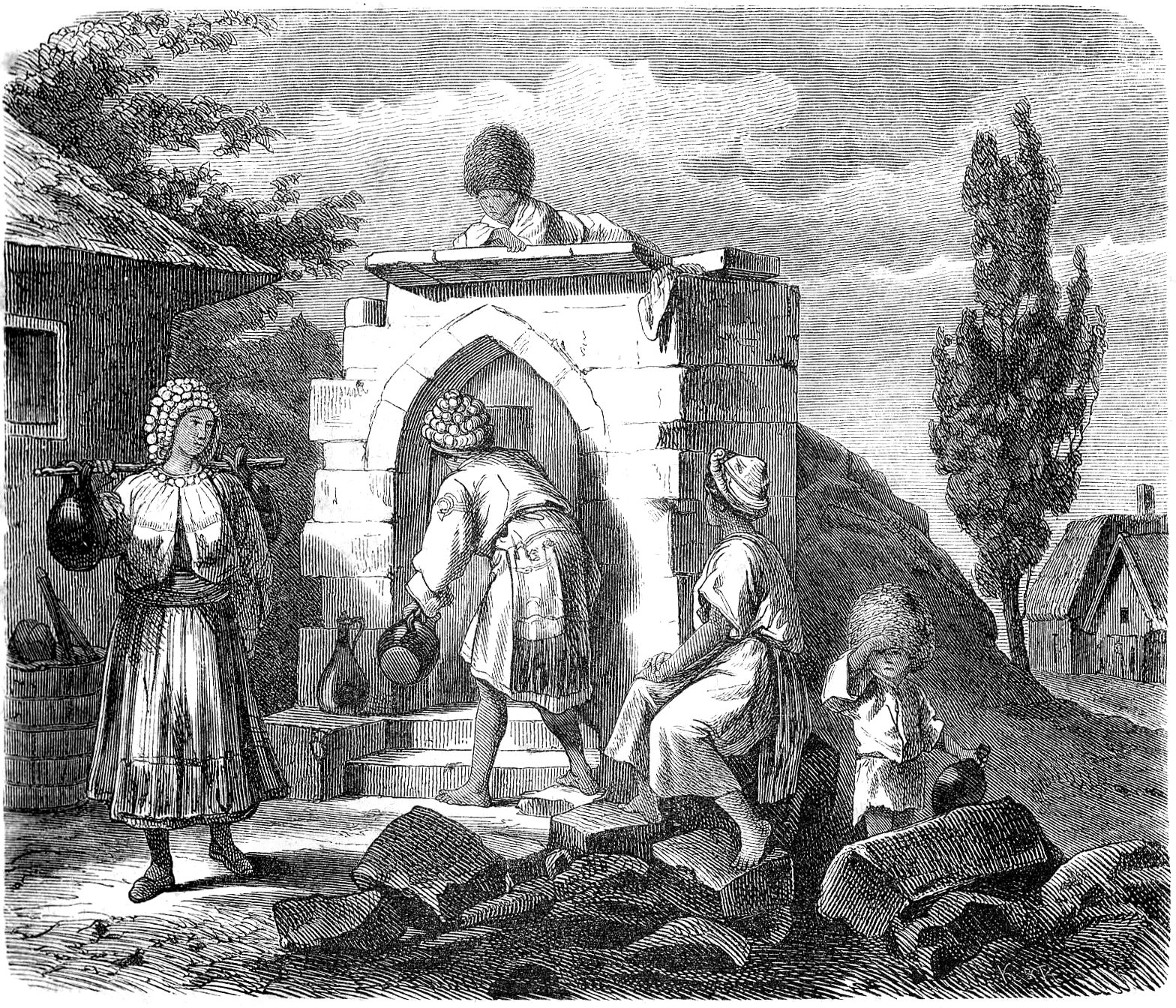
Vlachs in the village of Ždrelo (Petrovac)

As early as the 1920s, the Dutch Slavist van Nikolaas van Wijk proposed a theory suggesting that, during the Early Middle Ages, Serbs were separated from Bulgarians by a belt inhabited by a Vlach population. It was only later – after these Romanians partially migrated to other regions and partially succumbed to assimilation – that the western and eastern branches of the South Slavs came into direct contact. This perspective harmonizes with the findings of linguistic geography which (long after van Wijk) established a very strong concentration of isoglosses along the demarcation line between the two large blocks of the South Slavic ethnic group. From the mouth of the Timok River, across the eastern foothills of the mountains along the Serbian-Bulgarian border to Osogovo, and further to Ovče Polje and south of Tetovo, there exists a bundle of isoglosses that must be at least a thousand years old. In addition to linguistic evidence, anthropological and archaeological research also shows that during their settlement, the Slavs found southwestern Serbia almost completely deserted, while significant groups of the indigenous population (Romanoi/Romans) survived in the north and east of the country. The process of Slavicization and population mixing was not instantaneous; although the Slavs permanently settled in the 7th century, intensive anthropological mixing with the locals only began at the end of the 11th century. Over time, the indigenous population either migrated toward the territory of present-day Romania or was assimilated through the expansion of the medieval Serbian state's borders.

The aforementioned Romance belt, previously a part of Moesia, became part of the Morava region in the 9th century, while in the 11th century, it was part of the Byzantine Theme of Bulgaria.

- The codex of the Mount Athos St. Panteleimon Monastery states, among other things, the following: "Those who lived around the Danube – Bulgarians, Moravians (Serbs and Vlachs), and the Slavs of Illyria – were finally enlightened by holy baptism during the 9th century [the year 864] during the reign of Autokrator Michael and the glorious Patriarch Photios."
- In 1020, Basil II the Bulgar-Slayer established a separate bishopric for the Vlachs with its seat in Vranje, which fell under the jurisdiction of the Archbishopric of Ohrid. Specifically, the chrysobull reads, among other things: "Likewise, all towns that were omitted by the charter of my majesty shall nevertheless be subjected to the authority of the same most holy archbishop, who shall collect taxes from everyone, including the Vlachs living scattered throughout the whole of Bulgaria."
- In his Strategikon, written around 1078, Kekaumenos says regarding the origin of the Vlachs (Aromanians): "For these are those who are called Dacians and Bessi. Formerly they lived near the Danube and the Saos River, which we now call the Sava River... Having departed from there, they [the Vlachs] were scattered throughout all of Epirus and Macedonia, while most of them settled in Greece.
- The Vlachs in the Danubian region are mentioned by Anna Komnene in The Alexiad when the Cumans crossed the Danube around 1094.
- In 1154, the Arabic geographer Al-Idrisi referred to the entire region from the Morava River to the Osam River – which encompasses Pomoravlje and part of western Bulgaria – as Getulia, meaning the land of the Getaj or Nomads, as the Sicilian merchants called them. The inhabitants were Slavs and Vlachs.
- In 1185, the Bulgarians and Vlachs (Romanians) revolted under the leadership of the boyars Peter and Asen, who were of Vlach origin. Their brother Kaloyan was crowned in Tarnovo by an envoy of Pope Innocent III as dominus blacorum et bulgarorum (Lord of the Vlachs and Bulgarians). Those from northern Bulgaria and Serbia spoke the same dialect as the Romanians north of the Danube – linguists call it Daco-Romanian. From their ranks rose those who initiated the anti-Byzantine rebellion at the end of the 12th century, led by the Asen brothers; thus, they were the standard-bearers of the political rebirth of the Bulgarian Empire. Today, only a few of their settlements remain in the northwestern part of Bulgaria and in Serbia, particularly in the Timok Valley (Timočka Krajina).
- The chronicler Ansbert writes that the crusaders: "in the great Bulgarian forest itself, which they entered while advancing from Braničevo on July 15, 1189, were ambushed by Greeks, Bulgarians, Serbs, and semi-barbarian Vlachs, who attacked them from hidden places with poisoned arrows by order of the Duke of Braničevo and the Byzantine Emperor."
- During the years 1202 and 1203, Prince Bellota of Braničevo (princeps Bellota) appears in historical sources, maintaining independent correspondence with Pope Innocent III. Bellota (rom. Balotă) was likely a Catholic and a relative of Kaloyan. There is a high probability that he was of Vlach origin—specifically belonging to the lineage of Kaloyan's mother—making him either his maternal uncle or grandfather.
- From the correspondence between Pope Innocent III and King Kaloyan in 1204, we learn of a dispute that Bulgaria had with Hungary regarding the land of Wallachia, located right on the border between Hungary and Bulgaria. The same papal register further attests to the key diplomatic role of Bishop Blaise of Braničevo (Blasius, episcopus Brandizuberensis), whom Kaloyan dispatched to Rome as his envoy and plenipotentiary.
- In 1211, Gervase of Tilbury, describing the very same area that the chronicler Ansbert had previously called the great Bulgarian forest, writes that: "From the parting of the Danube all the way to Constantinople is a twenty-four day journey to the southeast. First, namely, one encounters the Bulgarian desert, which is the land of the Vlachs (Wallachia)."
- In 1253, William of Rubruck writes: "Yes, and across the Danube too, towards Constantinople, Wallachia, which is the land of Asen, and Minor Bulgaria all the way to Slavonia, all pay tribute to the Tatars."
- Drman and Kudelin were two Bulgarian nobles, of Tatar or Vlach origin, who ruled Braničevo (the Danubian region) as semi-independent rulers at the end of the 13th century (1273–1291).
- From a letter in 1345 sent by Pope Clement VI to King Louis I of Hungary, it is mentioned that certain Vlachs of Hungary, Transylvania, Wallachia, and the land of Syrmia had converted to Catholicism.
- The title of the Wallachian voivodes in the period from 1389 to 1421, and from 1508 to 1638, read: "Lord of Ungro-Wallachia and the Danubian Region."
- In the 14th and 15th centuries, important migratory movements of the Vlach population took place from Kosovo and around the Vardar River toward the north, and they settled in the valleys of the Timok and Morava rivers. At the same time, another part of this Vlach element moved toward Niš, penetrated through the Nišava valley all the way to Sredna Gora in Bulgaria, and then from Sofia moved northwestward all the way to the Serbian border.
- In 1446, Pope Eugenius IV informed all the faithful that a numerous sect of Hussites existed in Moldavia, who had infected even a portion of the inhabitants of Hungary with their dogmas. For this reason, the pontiff appointed Fabian, a vicar of the Minorite order from Bosnia, and his successors, as lifelong inquisitors against heretics in Moldavia, Wallachia, Wallachia across the Danube, Bulgaria, Raška, and Slavonia.
- Around 1481, Martin Segon mentions the Vlachs in northeastern Serbia, saying of them: "The Vlachs are highlanders, a wild race of men—they are rich only in herds of livestock." and "The middle of the province is inhabited by Vlachs, of whom Ptolemy writes: 'Those who lie between are called Picenses', and much has been said about them above in the first travelogue."
- In the 15th and 16th centuries, following the Ottoman conquest of the Tsardom of Vidin and the Serbian Despotate, Ottoman defters and kanun-names recorded Vlach populations in the Braničevo and Vidin areas. In the Vidin region, there existed a system originating from the Byzantine period to which the Vlachs were subject. The Ottomans incorporated this system into their own administrative structure, creating a semi-military class termed filurciyan, who were exempt from regular taxes and paid one gold coin (florin/filuri) per household. Tasked with securing the border regions, the filurci were of Vlach origin.
- In 1651, Petrus Possinus, in his commentaries on the Vlachs from The Alexiad, says: "Blachi is the name of the people who inhabit Upper Moesia, who are today called Valachi (Vlachs)."
- Evliya Çelebi, in his description of the town of Fetislam (Kladovo) from 1666, states that: "The entire population speaks Bosnian and Turkish, and they also know the Vlach language."
- Luigi Ferdinando Marsigli says of the Vlachs who dwelt around the Danube in 1696: "The Vlachs differ from the Rascians in both customs and language, although they profess the same Greek religion and use the same Illyrian characters (Cyrillic) of theirs. They begin to inhabit the banks of the Danube that originate from the ridges of the Haemus and Carpathian mountains, and they do not like to live in the plains, except in two provinces, Wallachia and Moldavia. They truly descend from the ancient Romans and boast that they are Romans, calling themselves by the corrupted name Ruminest; and their language is a corrupted Latin or Italic."
- In 1714, Dimitrie Cantemir says of the Vlach people: "The entire Roman-Vlach nation is today scattered across six regions: Moldavia, Wallachia, Bessarabia, Transylvania, Moesia, and Epirus in Greece" and that "Moesia follows the right bank of the Danube from the Iron Gates all the way to the Black Sea, in it, the towns, market squares, and villages are full of Romanians, mixed with Turks and Serbs."
- The Ottoman census defters of the Sanjak of Vidin from 1721/2 and 1723/4, as well as the censuses of Krajina and Ključ from 1740 and 1741, provide unequivocal onomastic evidence of the presence of the Vlach population in the area of present-day northwestern Bulgaria and eastern Serbia. An analysis of the personal names recorded in these historical sources enables precise mapping of Vlach settlements, pointing to a clear demographic and ethnic connection between the population of that time and the contemporary population inhabiting the same areas today.
- From the Minutes on the Examination of the Material, Moral, and Intellectual State of the Clergy in Krajina and Ključ (10–19 March 1736), we learn that liturgical books in Vlach villages were in the Vlach language, and that certain priests originated from Wallachia. In the autumn of 1836, a comprehensive census of all churches and monasteries in the Principality of Serbia was carried out. When it comes to Krajina and Ključ, sources testify that Vlach villages retained their liturgy in the Vlach, i.e., Romanian language. Unlike Bulgaria, where liturgy and school instruction took place in Romanian until 1913, its use was prohibited in Serbia as early as the 19th century. The existence of ethnic Vlachs in the Ottoman Empire is indisputable, and their distinct ethnic identity in the 18th century—in the areas of eastern Serbia that they still inhabit today—has been scientifically proven.
- In 1787 in Vienna, by imperial decree, a war proclamation ("patent") was drafted for the population in Turkey, issued in three similar forms: one for the Serbs, another for the Vlachs, and a third for the Turks, promising the Emperor’s protection to the population. The Vlach population was the only one that showed a friendly disposition toward the Turks.
- From the census of Vlachs conducted in the Principality of Serbia in 1850, there were 104,807 Vlachs, making up 10.95% of the total population of Serbia.

== Legal status ==
The Serbian state considers Vlachs a distinct ethnic minority rejecting any conflation with the Romanians, citing census results and their right of self-identification with the ethnicity of their choice. On the other hand, Romania's stance is that the Vlachs are Romanians, claiming the split between "Romanian" and "Vlach" identities as artificial and accusing Serbia of failing to protect the ethnic minority rights of the Romanians in eastern Serbia.

By provisions of the 2002 Romania–FR Yugoslavia agreement, the Federal Republic of Yugoslavia agreed to recognize the Romanian identity of the Vlach population in eastern Serbia, but the agreement was not implemented.

In 2005, 23 deputies from the Council of Europe, representatives from Hungary, Georgia, Lithuania, Romania, Moldova, Estonia, Armenia, Azerbaijan, Denmark, and Bulgaria protested against Serbia's treatment of this population.

In 2011, the Senate of Romania postponed for several months the ratification of Serbia's candidature for membership in the European Union until the legal status and minority right of the Romanian (Vlach) population in Serbia was clarified.

According to a 2012 agreement between Romania and Serbia, members of the Vlach community who self-declare as Romanians are provided access to education, media, and religion in the Romanian language.

== Controversy over ethnic identity ==
The identity and ethnic classification of the Vlachs in Serbia is highly contested. These disputes also occur between Vlachs themselves: an "anti-Romanian" group and "pro-Romanian" group. The former regards Serbia as the homeland of the Vlachs and rejects any connection to Romania whatsoever, while the latter relates Vlachs and Romanians through elements such as language and often regards Romania as the homeland of the Vlachs, although both agree on the need for the Serbian state to do more to protect Vlachs.

The situation within the National Council of the Vlach National Minority is particularly convulsed. In 2009, during an interview for the Serbian newspaper Politika, Živoslav Lazić, the president of the Council and then mayor of Veliko Gradište (Grădiștea Mare), called the efforts by "some in Serbia" to prove that the Romanians and Vlachs are two distinct minorities as "xenophobic". He also argued that claims about Romanianization of Vlachs by Romania come from people whose real aim is the assimilation of Vlachs. In 2010, shortly before the first elections to choose the members of the Council, Vlach politician Miletić Mihajlović accused the council of being pro-Romanian and of having as its main objective "transfer" Vlachs into Romanians, adding that Serbia was the homeland of the Vlachs. The new convocation of the Council, elected in 2010, was led by members of major Serbian parties (Democrat Party and Socialist Party of Serbia), most of whom were ethnic Serbs with no relation to the Vlach minority. The new president, Radiša Dragojević, stated that "Nobody has the right to ask Vlachs to declare themselves as Romanians", that "Vlachs consider Serbia their motherland", and that "We have no objections, nor any basis to turn to Romania, nor does Romania have any basis to make any demands on our behalf". According to Dragojević, out of 23 members of the Council, only four were pro-Romanian. In 2018, a new convocation of the council was elected, and the coalition "Vlachs for Serbia" won 22 of the 23 seats. Dragojević, who was re-elected president of the Council, commented that their result was due to pro-Romanian Vlach political organizations having either boycotted the election or having run for the election for the National Council of the Romanian National Minority instead. Radiša Dragojević, the current president of the Council, has stated that no one has the right to ask the Vlach ethnic minority in Serbia to identify themselves as Romanian or veto anything. As a response to this statement, the cultural organizations Ariadnae Filum, Društvo za kulturu Vlaha - Rumuna Srbije, Društvo Rumuna - Vlaha „Trajan“, Društvo za kulturu, jezik i religiju Vlaha - Rumuna Pomoravlja, Udruženje za tradiciju i kulturu Vlaha „Dunav“, Centar za ruralni razvoj - Vlaška kulturna inicijativa Srbija and the Vlach National Party protested and accusing him of false narrative. The Vlach National Party accused the Serbian government of assimilation by using the National Council of the Vlach National Minority against the interests of this community.

There is a movement among some members of the Vlachs to align themselves with Romania and identify themselves as part of the broader Romanian identity in Serbia. As of 2009, an estimated several thousand Vlachs were attending secondary schools and universities in Romania. It has been said that there is a fear among some of the Serbian political elite that some of these could return to Serbia with a Romanian ethnic identity and influence the rest of the Vlach community. The Association of the Vlachs of Serbia stands out for the claim that Romania is the motherland of the Vlachs, that they speak Romanian and that Serbia tries to assimilate Vlachs by referring to them as Vlachs to separate them from the Romanian ethnicity. The Vlach National Party claimed that the Serbian state manipulated the culture and history of the Vlachs and imposed a "historical cultural construct" on them. Timoc Press is another pro-Romanian organization in the Timok Valley, funded by the Department for Romanians Everywhere of the Romanian government, which considers Vlachs and Romanians a single ethnicity, the former of which would be being assimilated by the Serbs. Even so, there are anti-Romanian organizations, such as the Vlach Democratic Party, whose president, Siniša Celojević, declared in 2012 that "the Vlachs of Serbia are not, and will never be, members of the Romanian ethnic minority" and that "Romania claims groups outside its borders to reinforce their historical continuity and ethnic identity taking advantage of the lack of ethnic minority rights for Vlachs to 'infiltrate' among them".

== Politics ==
The Vlach National Council is a representation body of the Vlach ethnic minority in Serbia, established for the protection of the rights and the minority self-government of Vlachs in Serbia.

The Vlach National Party and the Vlach Democratic Party are ethnic minority parties representing the interests of the Vlachs in Serbia.

== Demographics ==
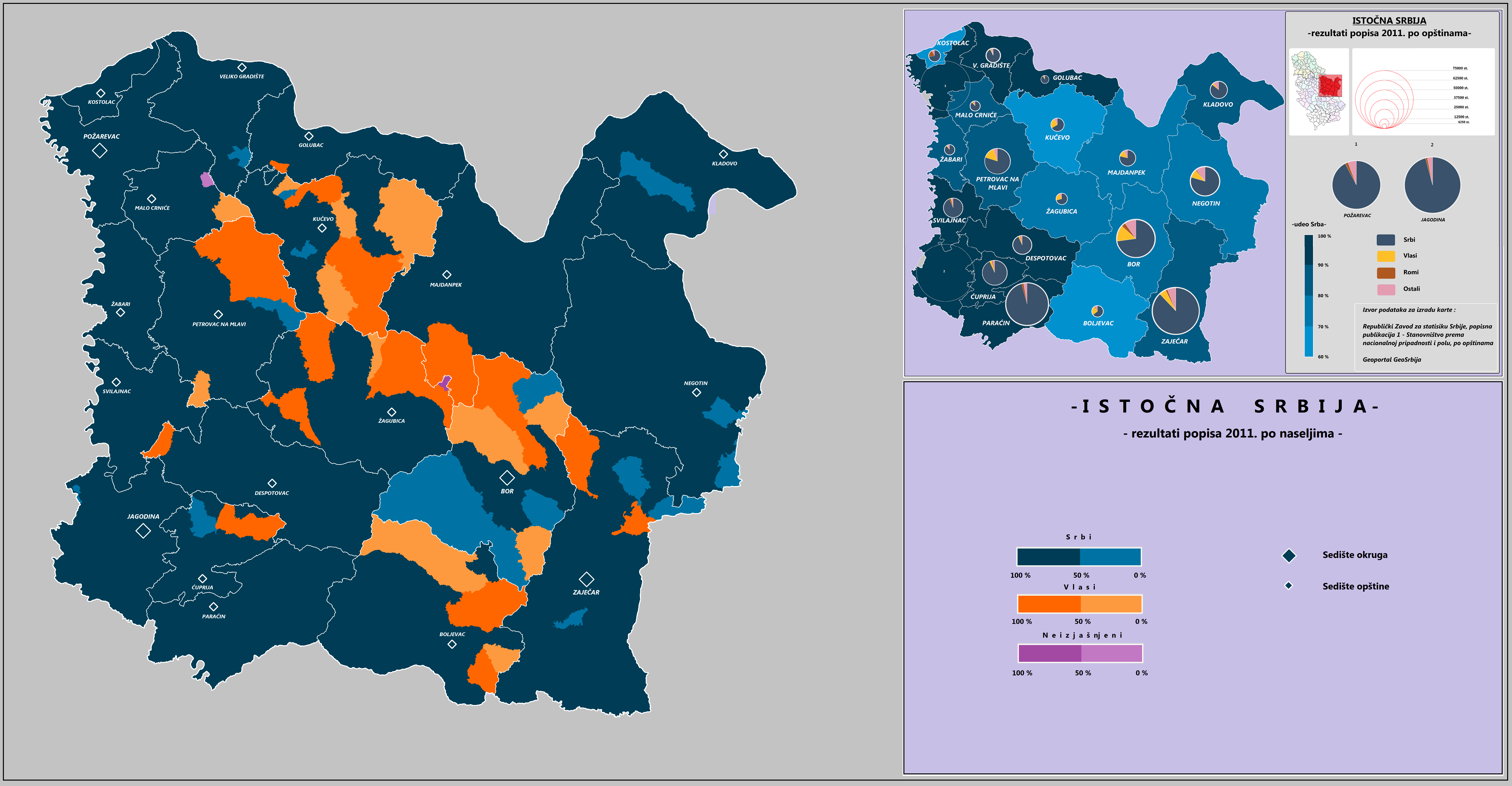
Ethnic map of eastern Serbia by settlements and municipalities, 2011 census

The largest concentration of Vlachs in Serbia is in the four easternmost administrative districts where over 90% of declared Vlachs live. According to data from the 2022 census, Vlachs constitute 8.1% of population in Bor District, 5.1% in Braničevo District, 3.2% in Zaječar District and 0.5% Pomoravlje District.

There are no municipalities with Vlach ethnic majority or plurality. However, there are 15 villages with either Vlach ethnic majority or plurality. The villages with Vlach ethnic majority are:

- Manastirica (Manastirița; Petrovac municipality)
- Busur (Busur; Petrovac municipality)
- Kladurovo (Cladurovo; Petrovac municipality)
- Brodica (Brogița; Kučevo municipality)
- Krivača (Crivacea; Golubac municipality)
- Osanica (Osanița; Žagubica municipality)
- Gornjane (Gorniane; city of Bor)
- Luka (Luca; city of Bor)

The villages with Vlach ethnic plurality are:

- Melnica (Melnița; Petrovac municipality)
- Starčevo (Starcevo; Petrovac municipality)
- Dubočane (Duboceani; city of Zaječar)
- Vlaole (Vlaole Mare; Majdanpek municipality)
- Debeli Lug (Dăbi Liug; Majdanpek municipality)
- Leskovo (Lescovo; Majdanpek municipality)
- Beljajka (Belaica; Despotovac municipality)

== Culture ==
=== Language ===
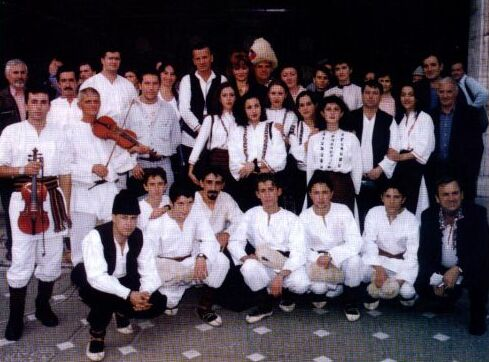
Vlachs from village of Jabukovac (Icubovăț) in traditional dress

The Vlachs speak a group of archaic Romanian varieties sometimes known as "Vlach" in Serbia. According to data from the 2022 census, 23,216 people declared Vlach as their mother tongue.

Romanian is not in use by the local administration in municipalities where members of the Vlach minority represent more than 15% of the population, where it would be allowed according to Serbian law, such as Kučevo and Žagubica (with Vlachs constituting 16.4% and 15% of population of the municipality, respectively). This is mostly because of a lack of teachers and because Romanian is more of an oral than a written language among Vlachs. Since 2012, there have been continuous efforts to standardize Vlach Romanian in a written form, and the teaching of Vlach Romanian has started in schools. While the Vlach Romanian standard written language is under development, the National Council of the Vlach National Minority in Serbia adopted in 2010 the use of Serbian as the official language and Romanian as the literary language. In 2012, the council decided to adopt a proposition on written and oral Romanian and started to work towards its standardization.

=== Religion ===
Most Vlachs are Orthodox Christians and have been part of the Serbian Orthodox Church since the 19th century. The 2006 Serbian Law on Churches and Religious Organizations did not recognize the Romanian Orthodox Church as a traditional church, as it had received permission from the Serbian Orthodox Church to have canonical authority only among Romanians in Banat, but not in eastern Serbia. At Malajnica (Mălainița), Bojan Aleksandrović, a Vlach priest belonging to the Romanian Orthodox Church encountered deliberately-raised administrative barriers when he attempted to build a church. In 2009, however, the Serbian state recognized the canonical authority of the Romanian Orthodox Church over the Vlach population in eastern Serbia.

=== Symbols ===
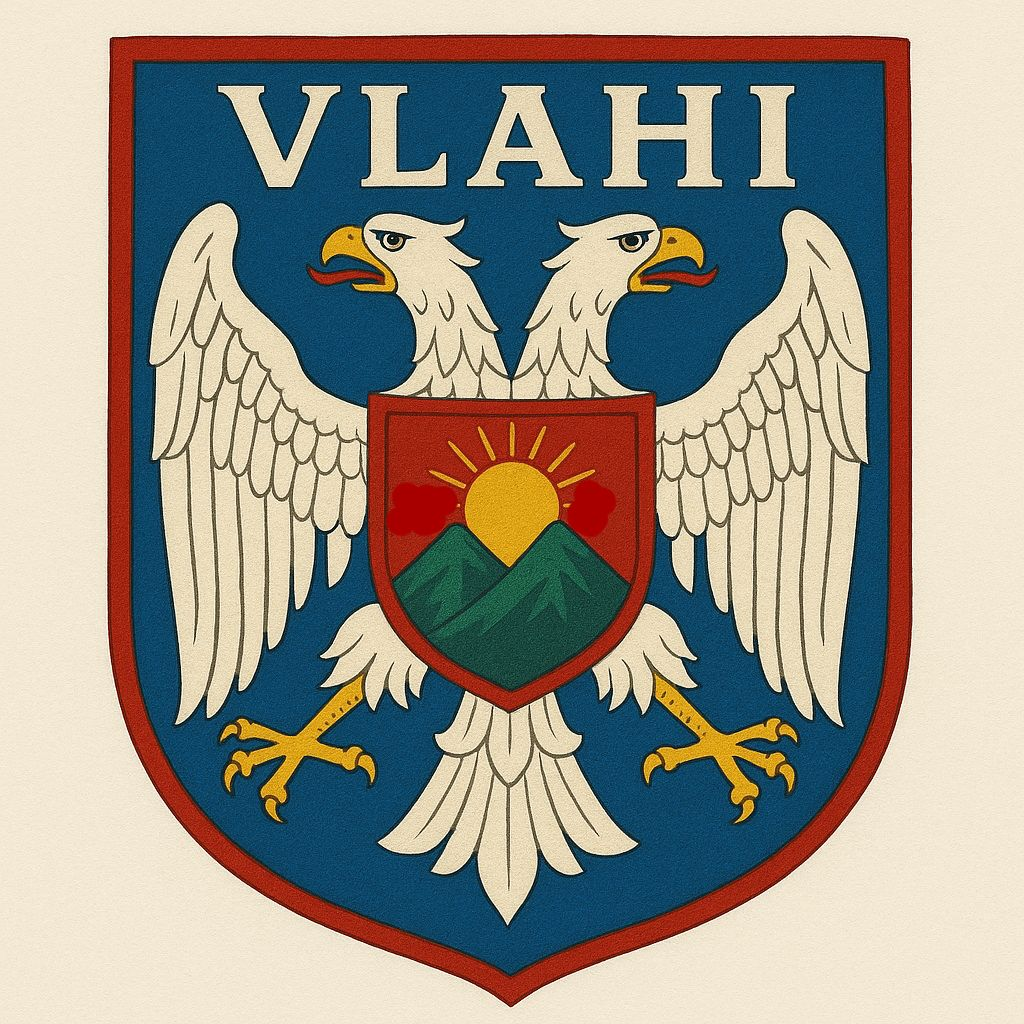
The coat of arms of the Vlachs adopted by the Vlach National Council in 2025

On 20 August 2025, at a meeting of the Vlach National Council in Požarevac, the council approved a flag and coat of arms to represent the Vlachs. The flag features four colors: red, blue, gold and white, arranged horizontally from top to bottom. According to the council, the red, blue and white represent the colors of the Serbian flag, while the gold symbolizes spiritual wealth, the sun, warmth and the historical origin in eastern Serbia. In the center, over a gold base, is a stylized white circle with nine rays emanating upwards from it, representing a sun. Below the sun are two mountains, shaped by two triangles, representing eastern Serbia and the region of Homolje (Homolie), where most Vlachs live. A stylized white line runs between the mountains, which can symbolize a river, a path or a connection between tradition and future.

The coat of arms is a shield with a blue field, which symbolizes justice, faith and freedom. It is framed by a red line, representing strength, courage and the historical struggle to preserve identity. Over the blue field is a double-headed heraldic eagle. Its wings are extended, symbolizing protection and power; and the eagle is white, representing purity and spiritual exaltation. That it is two-headed symbolizes unity between tradition and modernity and connection with the cultural influences of the Eastern and Western worlds. On the eagle's chest is a smaller red coat of arms. It features a sun, representing life, renovation and light; and is gold in color, signifying hope and the permanence of Vlach identity. The sun rises from two green mountains which represent eastern Serbia, the Vlachs' natural and spiritual homeland. Above the eagle, at the top of the shield, is the inscription Vlahi ("Vlachs") in bright color.

In addition, the Vlachs have the holidays of the Vlach Language Day on 24 January, the National Council's Feast Day of Saint Simeon the Myroblyte on 24 February and the National Council Day on 6 December. Regarding the Vlach Language Day (Zăua ljimbi Vlahilor), 24 January was the day in which, in 2012, in a meeting in Petrovac (Piatra Mlavei), the Vlach National Council adopted an alphabet in both Latin and Cyrillic for the Vlachs' language. And in the case of the National Council Day, on 6 December 2010, in its second ever meeting, held in Žagubica, the Vlach National Council adopted a document titled "Declaration of the Vlach National Council on the realization and advancement of the rights of the Vlach national community".

=== Vlach magic ===
The relative isolation of the Vlachs has permitted the survival of various pre-Christian religious customs and beliefs that are frowned upon by the Orthodox Church. Vlach magic rituals are well-known across modern Serbia. The Vlachs celebrate the ospăț (hospitium, in Latin), called in Serbian praznik or slava. The customs of the Vlachs are very similar to those from Southern Romania (Wallachia).

== Notable people ==
- Bojan Aleksandrović (born 1977), priest
- Ivan Babejić (c. 1896–1934), hajduk and soldier
- Predrag Balašević (born 1974), politician
- Paun Es Durlić (born 1949), ethnologist
- Slavoljub Gacović (born 1956), ethnologist
- Miletić Mihajlović (born 1951), politician
- Izvorinka Milošević (born 1954), singer
- Branko Olar (born 1948), singer
- Staniša Paunović (born 1947), singer
- Safet Pavlović (born 1965), politician
- Dușan Pârvulovici (born 1966), activist
- Atanasie Popovici (c. 1887–1958), schoolteacher, minority rights activist and Romanian irredentist
- Adam Puslojić (1943–2022), poet, translator and writer
- Cristea Sandu Timoc (1916–2012), writer, historian and folklorist

== See also ==
- Romanians in Serbia
- Aromanians in Serbia
- Vlachs in medieval Serbia
- Vlachs of Croatia
- Romanians in Bulgaria
