= Malajnica =

Malajnica Malajnica / Малајница (Serbian) Mălainița (Romanian)
- Village
- Location within Serbia
- Coordinates: 44°17′43″N 22°23′8″E
- Country: Serbia
- District: Bor District
- Municipality: Negotin

Population (2002)
  - Total: 683
- Time zone: UTC+1 (CET)
  - Summer (DST): UTC+2 (CEST)

Malajnica (Romanian: Mălainița; Serbian Cyrillic: Малајница) is a village in the municipality of Negotin, Serbia. According to the 2002 census, the village has a population of 683 people.

== Ethnic groups (2002 census) ==
- Serbs = 364
- "Vlachs" (Romanians) = 225
- Romanians (self-declared) = 4
- Croats = 1
- undeclared = 42
- unknown = 47

== Politics ==
In 2004, the Romanian Orthodox Church, Malajnica, the first Romanian Church was built in eastern Serbia in two centuries. The Helsinki Committee for Human Rights in Serbia drew attention to the situation of the Romanian people living there, and to their right to preserve their national identity. The president of Romania Traian Băsescu visited the village on November 2, 2011.

== History ==
In 1807 Karađorđe's soldiers during the First Serbian Uprising were joined by Russian troops, led by General Ivan Ivanovich Isaev in a battle against the Turkish army near Malajnica.

== Notable people ==
- Bojan Aleksandrović, vicar of Mălainița and Remesiana and presbyter of Dacia Ripensis.
