= Dubočane =

Dubočane Дубочане Duboceani
- Village
- Location within Serbia
- Coordinates: 44°06′23″N 22°16′13″E
- Country: Serbia
- District: Zaječar District
- Municipality: Zaječar

Area
  - Total: 32.31 km^{2} (12.47 sq mi)
- Elevation: 383 m (1,257 ft)

Population (2022)
  - Total: 289
  - Density: 8.94/km^{2} (23.2/sq mi)
- Time zone: UTC+1 (CET)
  - Summer (DST): UTC+2 (CEST)

Dubočane (Serbian: Дубочане; Romanian: Duboceani) is a village located in the administrative area of the City of Zaječar, Serbia. It has a population of 289 inhabitants (2022 census), a plurality of them Vlachs.
