= Gornjane =

Gornjane Горњане Gorniane
- Village
- Location within Serbia
- Coordinates: 44°17′52″N 22°02′44″E
- Country: Serbia
- District: Bor District
- Municipality: Bor

Population (2022)
  - Total: 731
- Time zone: UTC+1 (CET)
  - Summer (DST): UTC+2 (CEST)

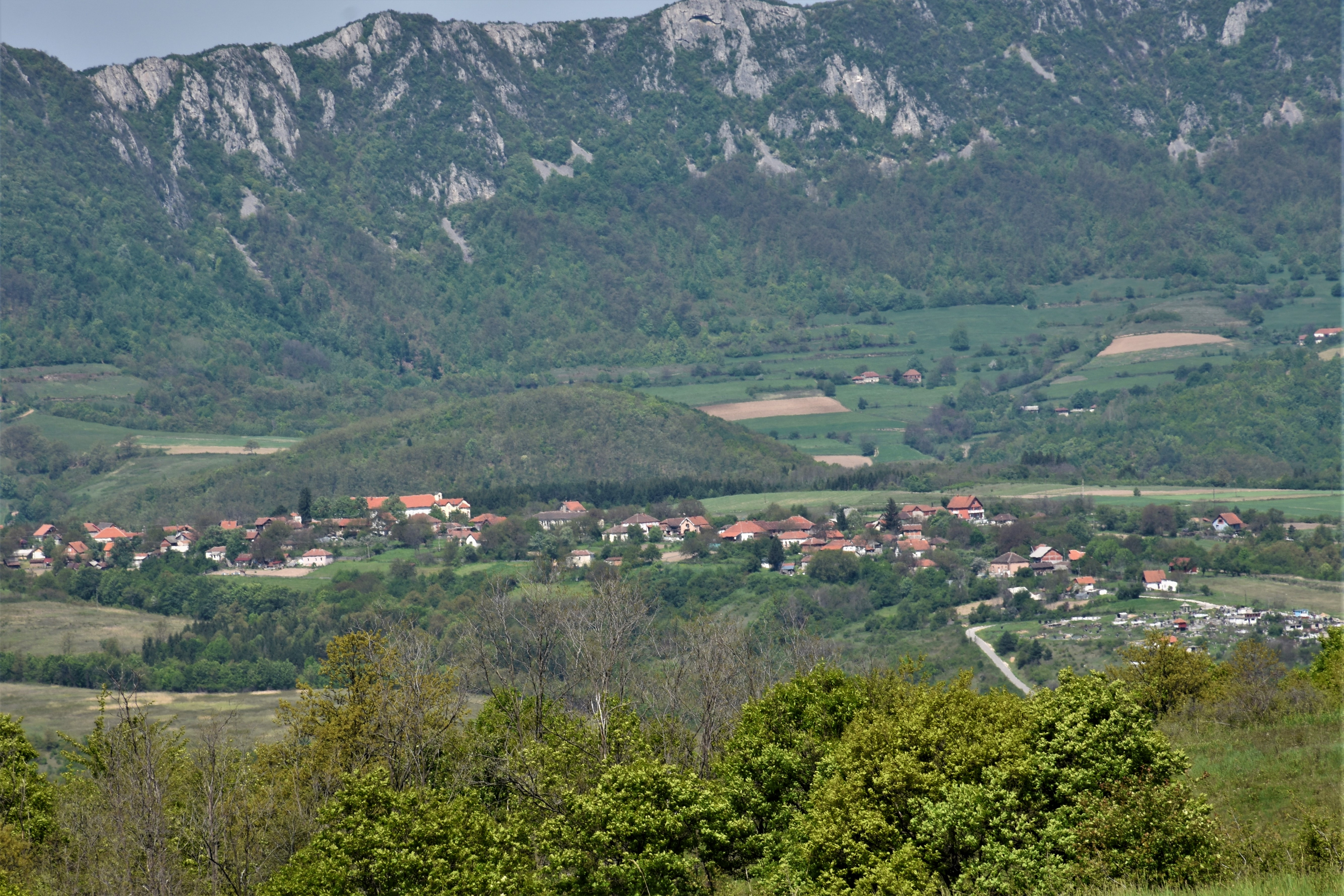
View of Gornjane

Gornjane (Serbian Cyrillic: Горњане; Romanian: Gorniane) is a village in the administrative area of the City of Bor, Serbia. It has a population of 731 inhabitants (2022 census), a majority of them Vlachs.
