= Kladurovo =

Kladurovo Кладурово Cladurovo
- Village
- Location within Serbia
- Coordinates: 44°26′19″N 21°32′17″E
- Country: Serbia
- District: Braničevo District
- Municipality: Petrovac na Mlavi

Population (2022)
  - Total: 317
- Time zone: UTC+1 (CET)
  - Summer (DST): UTC+2 (CEST)

Kladurovo (Serbian: Кладурово; Romanian: Cladurovo) is a village located in Petrovac municipality in Serbia. It has a population of 317 inhabitants (2022 census), a majority of them Vlachs.
