= Krepičevac Monastery =

Orthodox Monastery

Krepičevac Monastery Манастир Крепичевац
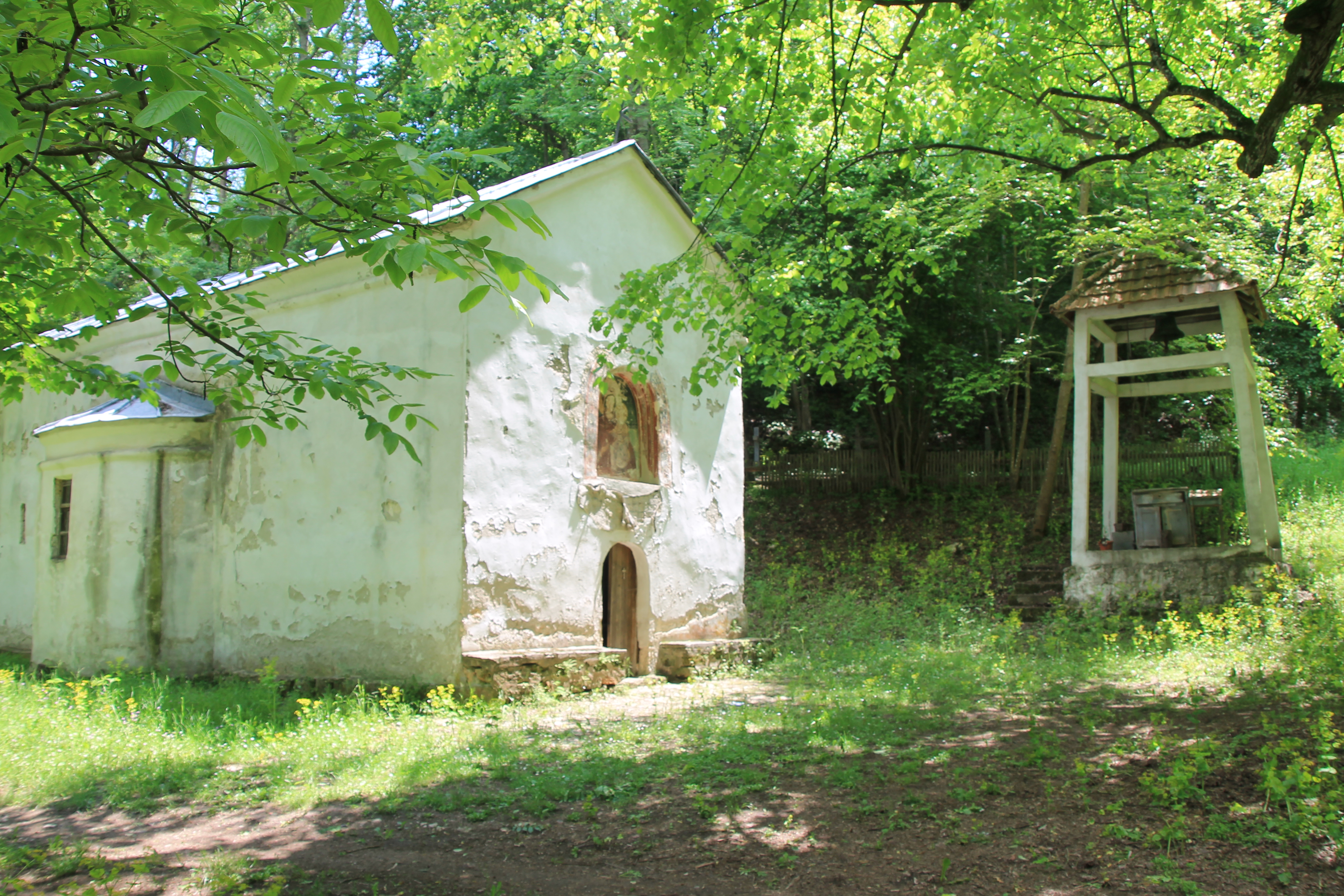
- Interactive map of Krepičevac Monastery; Манастир Крепичевац

Monastery information
- Full name: Манастир – Крепичевац
- Order: Serbian Orthodox
- Established: End of the 15th century and the beginning of the 16th century
- Dedication: Dormition of the Mother of God

People
- Founder: prefect Georgije

Site
- Location: Jablanica
- Coordinates: 43.8536°N 21.8505°E
- Public access: Yes

Krepičevac (Crnorečki) Monastery belongs to the Eparchy of Timok of Serbian Orthodox Church. It is located four kilometers north of the village of Jablanica, Serbia, in the gorge of the Radovan river. The monastery is dedicated to the Dormition of the Mother of God.

== History ==
The founder is considered to be prefect Georgije, son of Jan, who holds the model of the church on the foundation composition, next to him is his wife Zora, and next to her is her son Manojlo. Georgi is considered to be the grandson of Radul Bey (1499–1508). The time of construction is related to the end of the 15th century and the beginning of the 16th century. Historical records about this monastery are rare. He is mentioned as active in 1761 and 1780. In the 19th century, M. Đ. Milićević mentions a painting inside the church from 1761, and that under it you can see frescoes from an unknown era. No long period of time passed between the construction of Krepičevac and the nearby Lapušnja Monastery, and it is assumed that both monasteries had the same founders.

At the beginning of the 19th century, Hajduk Veljko together with Prince Milisav appointed Hieromonk Akaki from Sveta Gora as the head of the monastery, who in 1809 became the abbot of the monastery, as evidenced by an entry in a liturgical book. Together with the monastery in Grliste, it belongs to the most persistent places in the fight against the Turks during the days of the First Serbian uprising. Six nuns and seven novices from the Kuveždin Monastery were moved to this abandoned monastery in the Eparchy of Timok in 1930. The nun, and later abbess of the monastery Angelina Ličanin (worldly known as Vidosava), who sold her two houses near the Palace Albanija in Belgrade to rebuild the monastery and used the money to build a dormitory for the sisters, was buried in the monastery gate in 1969.

== Architecture ==
The church of the monastery was built on the site of an older church and is a small building with a trefoil base. It was created under the influence of the architecture of the Morava architectural school. It is built of stone and plastered.

== Painting ==
Fresco-painting is very valuable, so the monastery itself is counted among the most important cultural monuments. The surface of the remaining fresco painting in the monastery is modest and dates from the first half of the 16th century.

One of the latest medieval foundational compositions in Serbia has been preserved. It is located on the northern wall of the chancel, in the first zone. The personalities are dressed in the rich costume of their time. The character of the founder's wife Zora presents her as intelligent and courageous. He stands out strikingly in the anthology of Serbian historical portraits with his exceptional artistic vision.

The inscription next to the founder's portrait reads: Receive the prayer of yours, O Puritan, little seed of the kingdom, George, son of John. On the unusually rare model of the church held by the founder, a significantly elevated part of the temple can be seen.

In the lower zone inside the church, there are several figures of saints, Archangel Michael, Pachomius the Great, Saint Constantine and Helena and Saint Mary of Egypt. On the altar is a composition of the Vision of Saint Peter of Alexandria. In the vestibule, there are compositions from the life of Christ and the Virgin Mary. Among them, Escape to Egypt stands out. On the eastern wall of the narthex, the composition Deisis is painted.

There are preserved fragments of frescoes on the western facade, which indicate that the monastery was also painted on the outside. In the niche, above the entrance to the church, there is a painted bust of the Virgin with Christ.

The artistic value of the monastery is enhanced by the rosette made of white marble, decorated with a floral ornament in shallow plastic. It is assumed that she was on the floor near the pulpit. One can see the identical ornamentation of this rosette with that of the Ovčar-Kablar monasteries.

In the nave in the southern wall, there is a recessed space, which is supposed to be the grave of the old man Joseph, one of the Sinaiites of the end of the 14th century.

== Renewals ==
There is no information on when it was abandoned and why. It was restored in 1679. In the 18th century, the monastery was restored by Prince Golub from Jablanica. Today, there are no residents, and it is served by parish priests.

== Gallery ==
Krepičevac Monastery

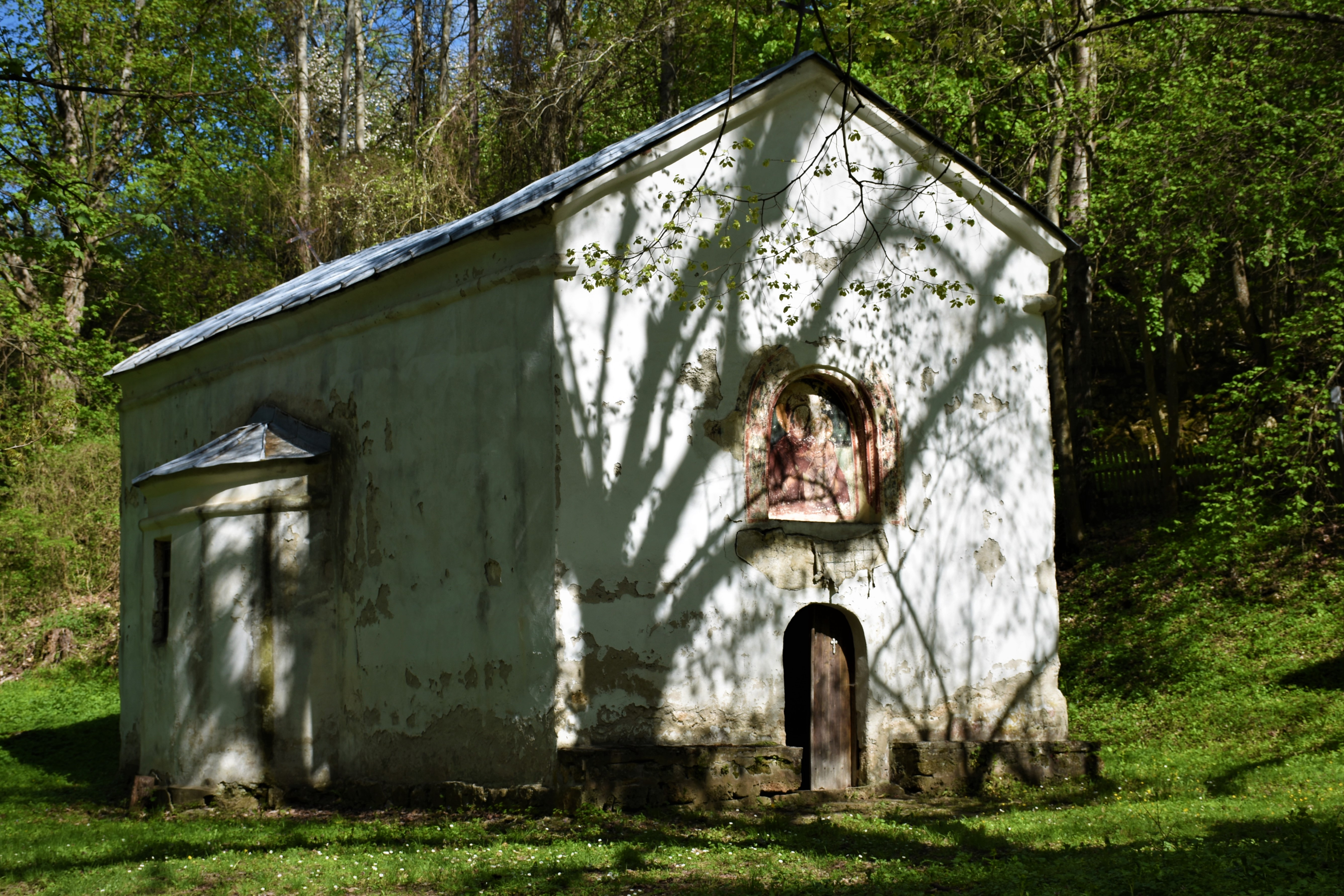
Krepičevac Monastery

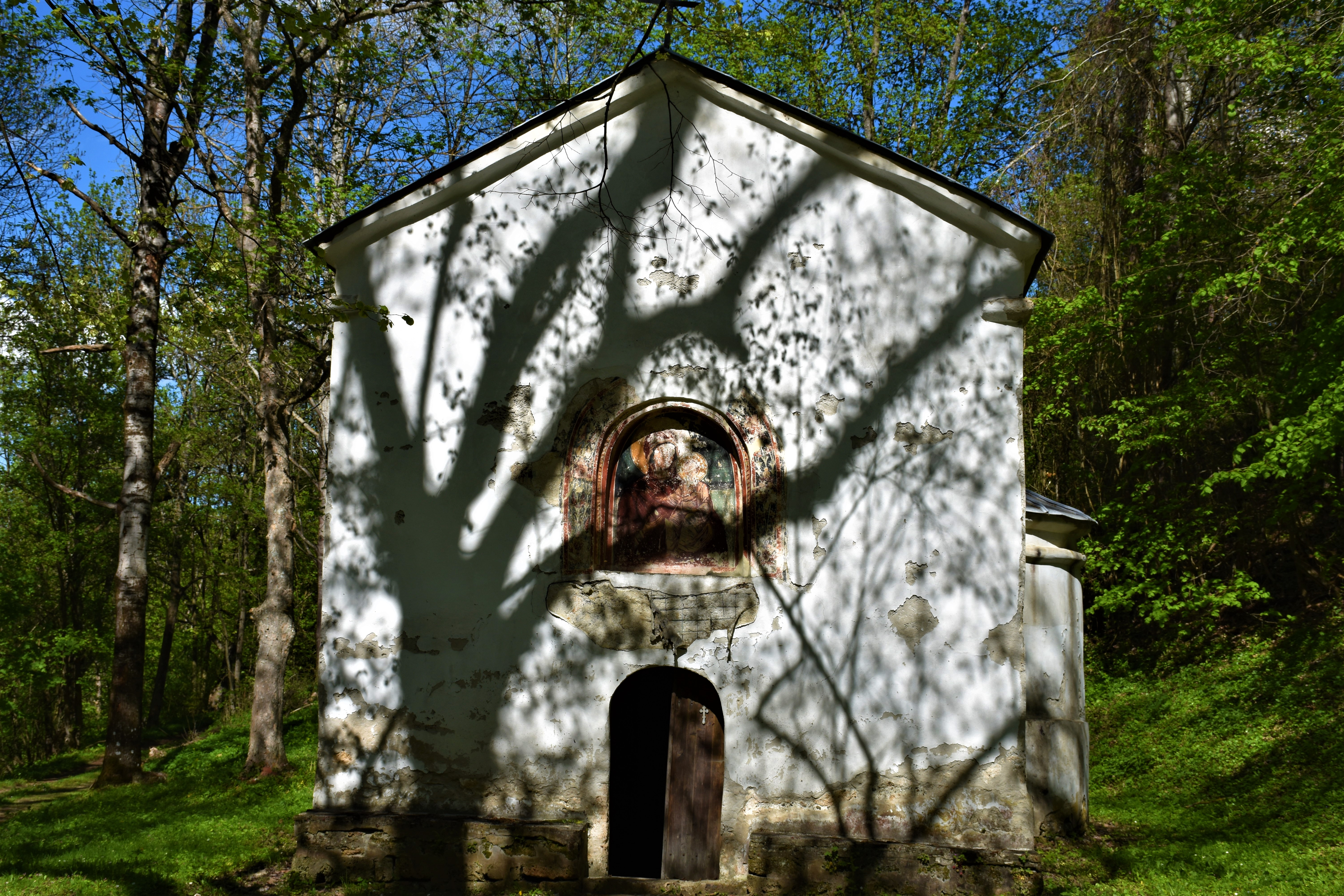
Krepičevac Monastery

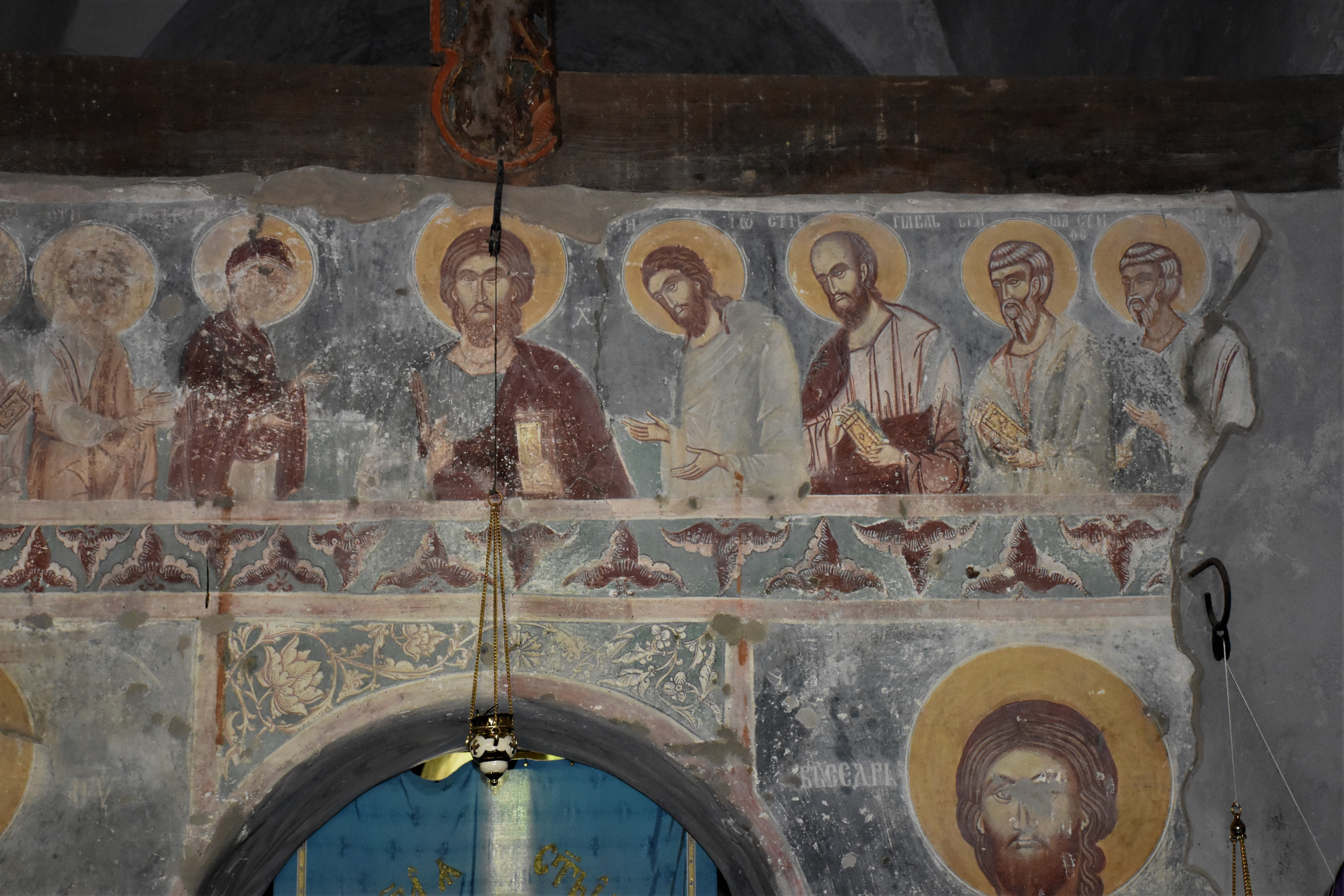
Preserved frescoes of the Krepičevac Monastery

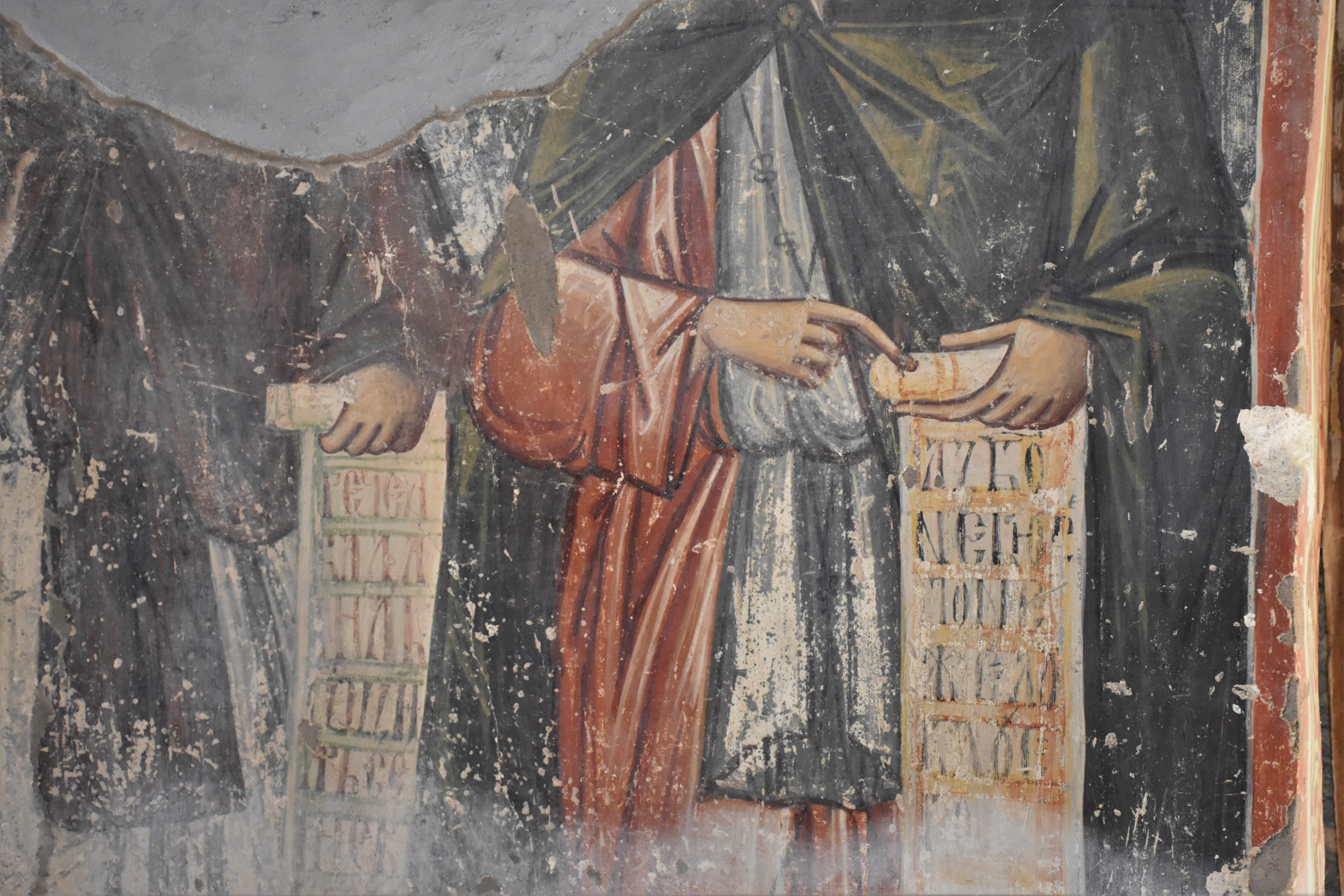
Preserved frescoes of the Krepičevac Monastery

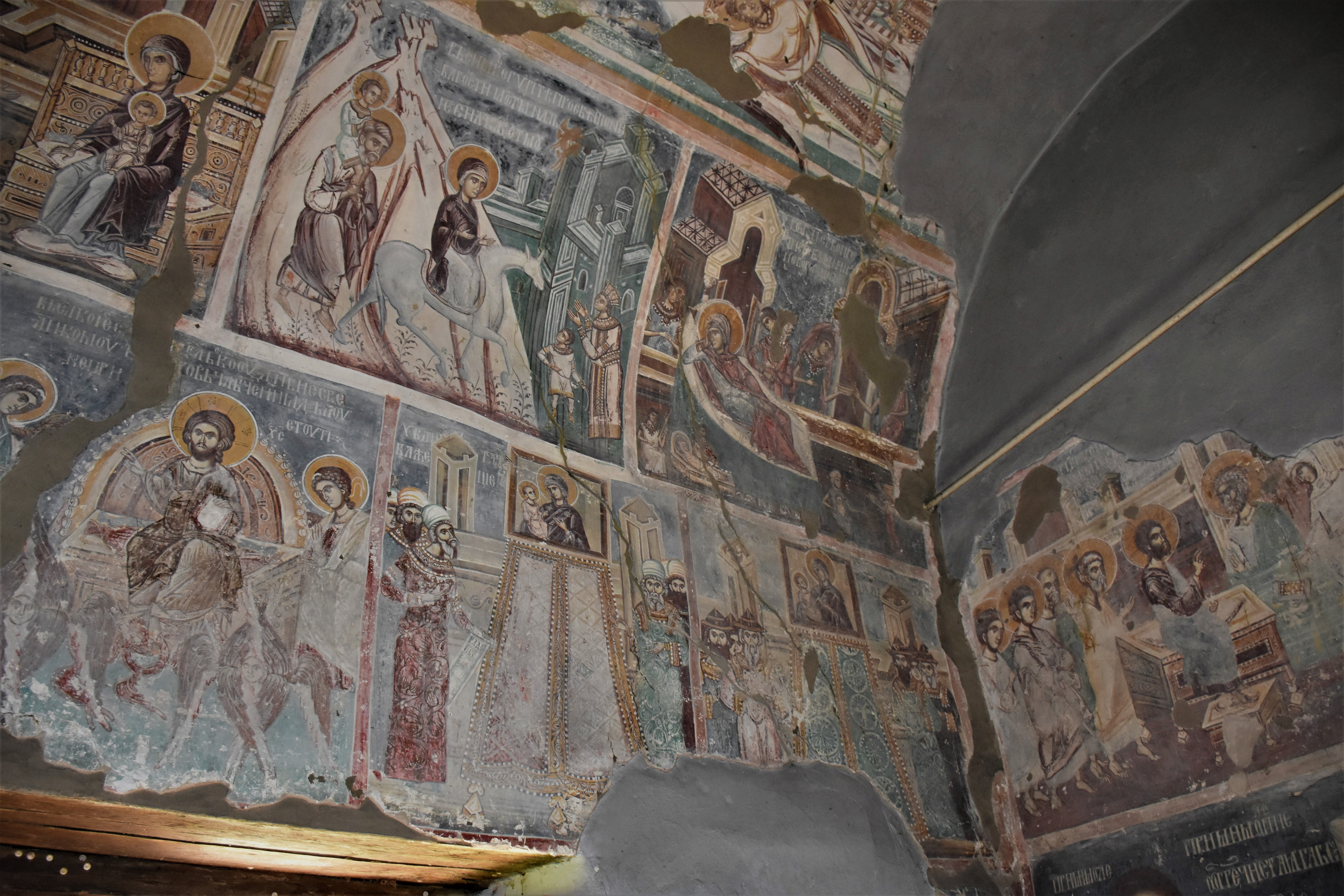
Preserved frescoes of the Krepičevac Monastery

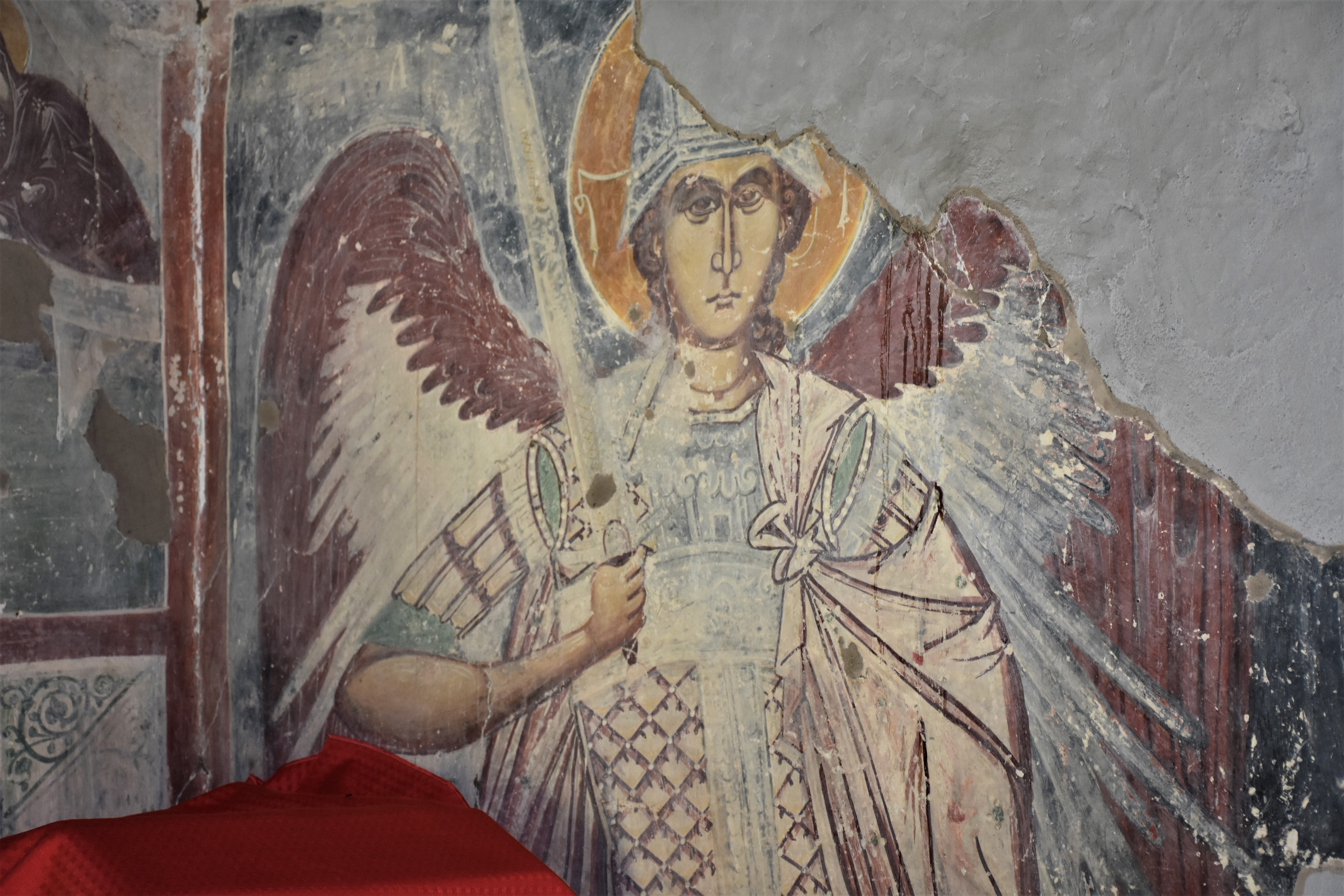
Preserved frescoes of the Krepičevac Monastery

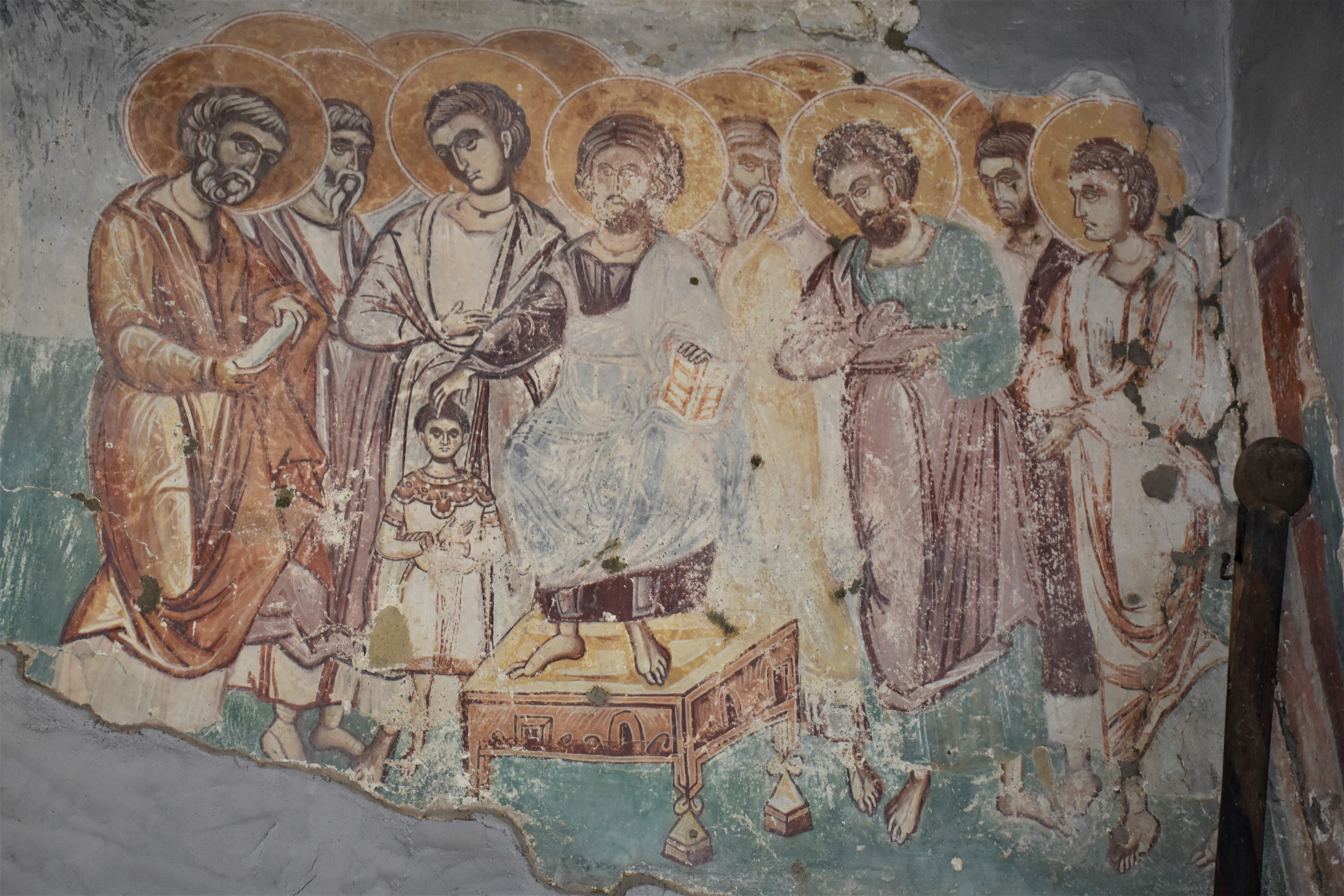
Preserved frescoes of the Krepičevac Monastery
