= Osanica (Žagubica) =

Osanica Осаница Osanița
- Village
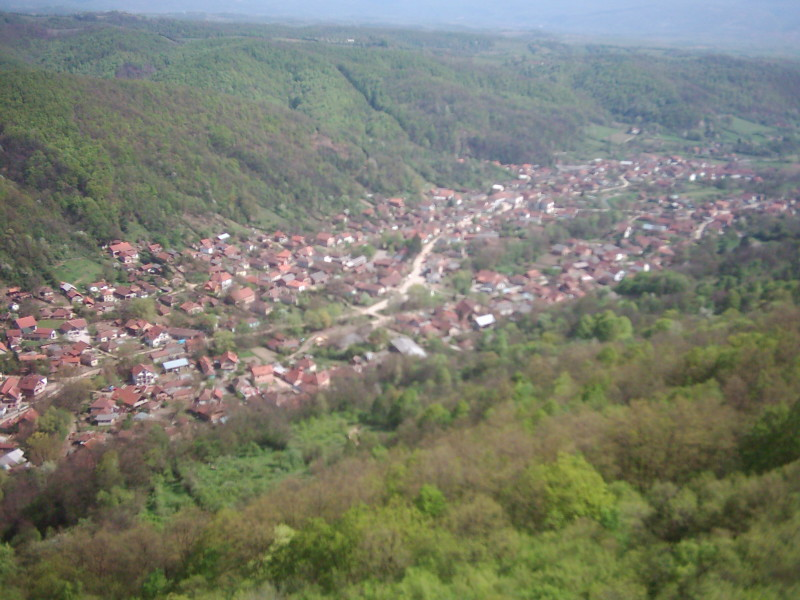

- Location within Serbia
- Coordinates: 44°16′50″N 21°40′3″E
- Country: Serbia
- District: Braničevo District
- Municipality: Žagubica

Population (2022)
  - Total: 882
- Time zone: UTC+1 (CET)
  - Summer (DST): UTC+2 (CEST)

Osanica (Serbian: Осаница; Romanian: Osanița) is a village in the municipality of Žagubica, Serbia. It has a population of 882 inhabitants (2022 census), a majority of them Vlachs.
