= Manastirica (Petrovac) =

Manastirica Манастирица Manastirița
- Village
- Location within Serbia
- Coordinates: 44°29′44″N 21°29′38″E
- Country: Serbia
- District: Braničevo District
- Municipality: Petrovac na Mlavi

Population (2022)
  - Total: 499
- Time zone: UTC+1 (CET)
  - Summer (DST): UTC+2 (CEST)

Manastirica (Serbian: Манастирица; Romanian: Manastirița) is a village located in Petrovac municipality in Serbia. It has a population of 499 inhabitants (2022 census), a majority of them Vlachs.
