= National Council of the Vlach National Minority =

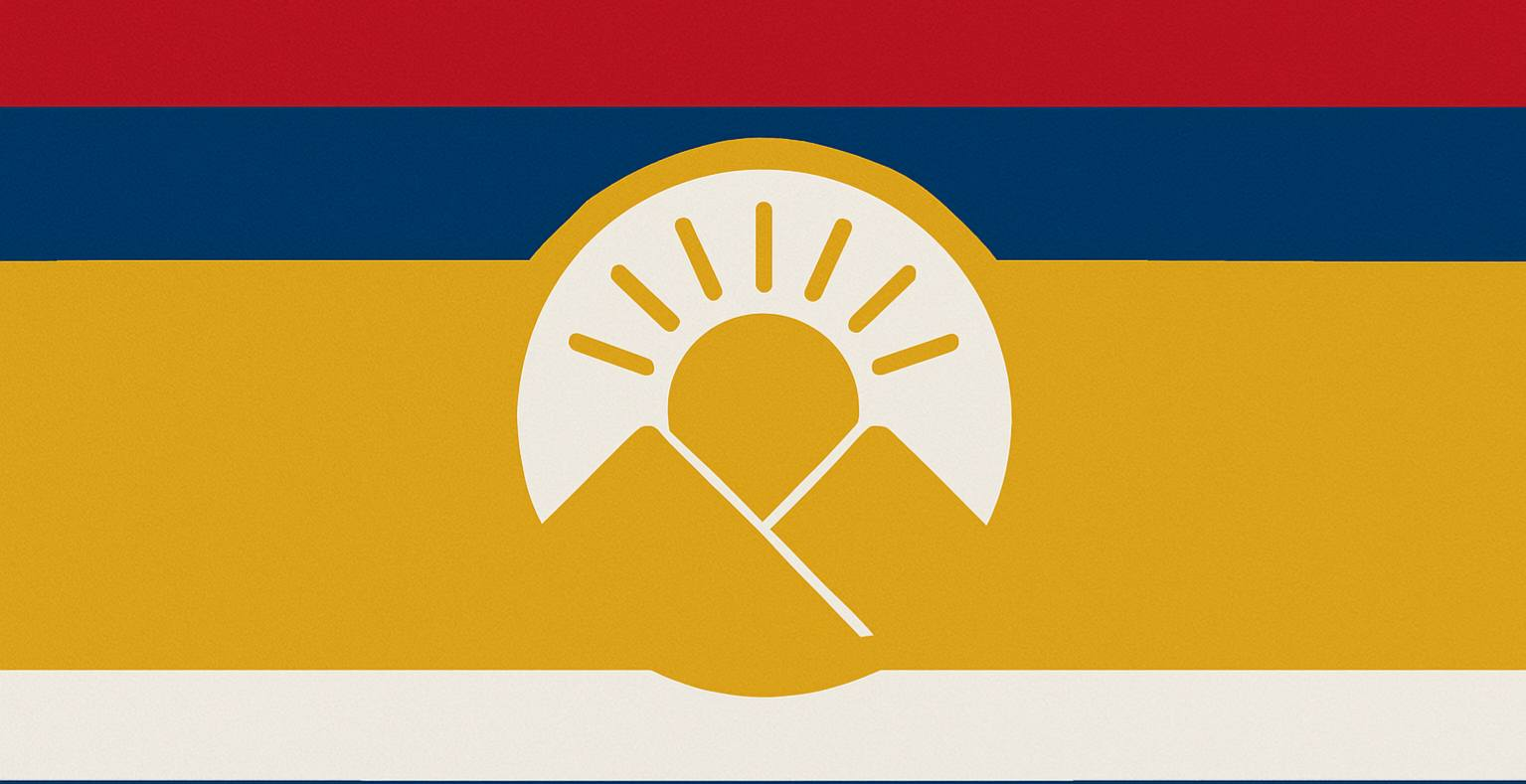
The flag of the Vlachs of Serbia adopted by the council in 2025

The National Council of the Vlach National Minority, or simply the Vlach National Council, is an institution representing the Vlachs of Serbia. Established in 2007, it has total control over issues regarding education, culture and mass media in the language of the Vlachs. Since its founding, the council has changed its structure and its attitude towards language several times.

The Vlachs are a community inhabiting eastern Serbia that speak an archaic variety of the Romanian language. Regarding their stance on their own language, the Vlachs are divided into two opposing factions, which researchers Monica Huțanu and Annemarie Sorescu Marinković termed as the "reintegrationists", who consider their language to be Romanian; and the "differentionalists" or "independentists", who consider that they speak a separate language of their own. The two researchers noted that, as of 2017, only the latter group was politically represented in the council, which could give the impression of consensus among the Vlachs on issues of language and also historical origin.

The council's day is on 6 December, when that day in 2010, in a meeting in Žagubica (Jagubița or Jăgobița), its second ever meeting, the Vlach National Council adopted the "Declaration of the Vlach National Council on the realization and advancement of the rights of the Vlach national community". In 2016, the council founded the Institute of Vlach Culture (Institutu di kultura Vlahilor), seated in Bor (Bor) and with the aim to preserve, promote and develop Vlach culture. On 20 August 2025, at a meeting in Požarevac, the council adopted a flag and a coat of arms to represent the Vlachs. The president of the council as of 2025 was Novica Janošević.

== See also ==
- National Council of the Romanian National Minority
