= Resavica (Despotovac) =

Resavica Ресавица
- Town
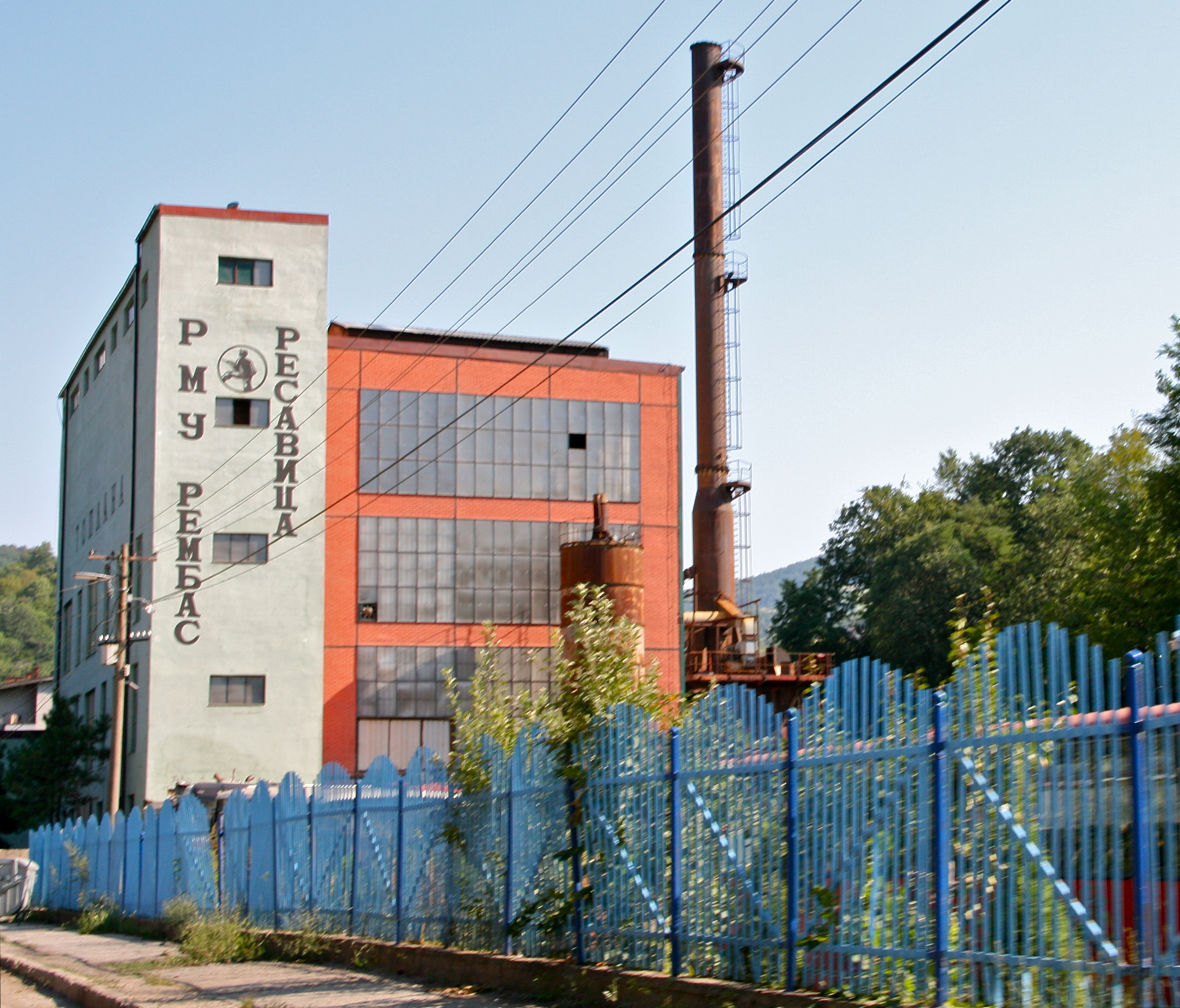
- Administrative building of Rembas Mine, part of PEU Resavica

- Location within Serbia
- Coordinates: 44°04′N 21°31′E
- Country: Serbia
- District: Pomoravlje District
- Municipality: Despotovac

Area
  - Total: 9.26 km^{2} (3.58 sq mi)
- Elevation: 470 m (1,540 ft)

Population (2011)
  - Total: 2,035
  - Density: 220/km^{2} (569/sq mi)
- Time zone: UTC+1 (CET)
  - Summer (DST): UTC+2 (CEST)
- Postal code: 35237
- Area code: 035
- Vehicle registration: DE

Resavica (Serbian Cyrillic: Ресавица) is a mining town located in the municipality of Despotovac, central Serbia. As of 2011 census, it has a population of 2,035 inhabitants.

== Mining history ==
Resavica lies at the core of a brown coal basin of central-eastern Serbia. The coal was exploited in the area, with shafts in Jelovac, Senjski Rudnik, and Strmosten since the mid-19th century. After World War II, the mines were nationalized, and a state-owned company "Senje-Resava Brown Coal Mines" was formed, with the seat in Resavica. It went through several renames and reorganizations, and today Resavica is the seat of the mining company PEU Resavica, which operates "Rembas" mine, with shafts in Jelovac, Ravna Reka, Senjski Rudnik and Strmosten.
