= Lomnica =

Lomnica Ломница
- Interactive map of Lomnica
- Coordinates: 44°14′N 21°28′E
- Country: Serbia
- District: Pomoravlje
- Municipality: Despotovac

Population
  - Total: 988
- Time zone: UTC+1 (CET)
  - Summer (DST): UTC+2 (CEST)
- Postal code: 35213
- Area code: +381 35
- Car plates: JA (old) DE (new)

Lomnica (Serbian Cyrillic: Ломница) is a village in Despotovac municipality, in the Pomoravlje District of Serbia.

== Geography ==
Lomnica is located 10 kilometers from the town of Despotovac and about 7 kilometers from Manasija Monastery. It is situated at (roughly) about 600 meters above sea level. It is the third largest village in the municipality (after villages Plažane and Veliki Popović). Near Lomnica is a small lake called Lomničko jezero, which is about 2 hectares in size for most of the year.

== History ==
In late 1803, knez Pana and his cousin Milija, who were born in the village, joined the conspiration to overthrow the Dahije from the Sanjak of Smederevo. During the First Serbian Uprising (1804–13), they initially fought under the command of obor-knez of Resava and vojvoda Stevan Sinđelić.

== Population ==
In 1953, the population of Lomnica was 770. In 2011, the population was recorded as 1284, with 324 total households.

== Features ==
The village has a part-time ambulance service with a doctor and nurse. It also has a modern football pitch with around 1,000 seats, along with other smaller football pitches and basketball courts.

== Sources ==
- Stojančević, Vladimir (1991). "Ћупријска нахија – Ресава у време Иванковачке битке 1805. године" (PDF). Balcanica. 22. Belgrade: SANU: 101–109.
