= Balajnac =

Balajnac may refer to:

- Balajnac (Despotovac), Serbia
- Balajnac (Merošina), Serbia
