= Resavica (disambiguation) =

Resavica may refer to:

- Resavica, a town in Serbia
- Resavica (village), a village in Serbia
- Resavica coal mine, a coal mine in Serbia
- Resavica (Resava), a river in Serbia, a tributary of the Resava
- Resavica (Great Morava) (Resavčina), a river in Serbia, a tributary of the Great Morava
