= Dragutin Aleksić =

Dragutin Aleksić Драгутин Алексић
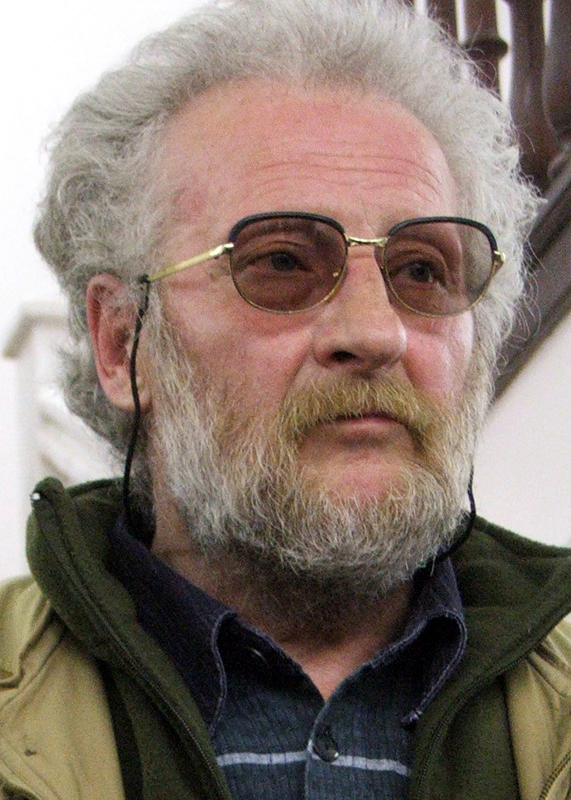
- Dragutin Aleksić
- Born: Dragutin Aleksić; 8 March 1947; Sladaja, Despotovac; Yugoslavia
- Died: 8 October 2011 (aged 64); Sladaja, Despotovac; Serbia
- Known for: Sculptor
- Movement: Naive art, Outsider art

Dragutin Aleksić (Serbian Cyrillic: Драгутин Алексић; 8 March 1947 – 8 October 2011), Serbian naive art and outsider art (also used terms: marginal art, brut art) sculptor.

== Biography ==
Dragutin Aleksić was a famous Serbian naïve and marginal art sculptor. He was born in Sladaja near Despotovac (Serbia) in 1947. He began doing sculpture in 1968. He died in Sladaja, near Despotovac (Serbia) in 2011.

== Artistic style ==
His preoccupation with existential problems of farmers, highlanders, miners is visible in the structures of extraordinary expressive force, achieved by a specific manner of procession, more with forceful cuts in the wood by an axe than by a sculptor's chisel. Led by a strong instinct and robust character, he processed the wood rustically, transmitting his raw energy into a wooden mass, emphasizing a predominant force of a man – highlander, who seizes from the nature in his fight for survival. In his sculptures with multiplied figures, central figures or events are rare. While doing sculpture Aleksić liberates a thought, not a tale, hence the intensity of expression is most pronounced in the mere procedure of cutting, quick and capricious, in order to make his idea visible as soon as possible. With deeper, abrupt, unexpected incision in wood he creates dynamic light effects in which the dance of light and shadow provides an additional dynamics to the whole work. He is an artist of action and instinct without pictorial deliberation. Therefore, his idea is raw, uncultivated, but direct, suggestive, sometimes schematically given but intensive and complete. From whole mass of monumental logs, heads and busts emerge, rarely whole human and animal figures and vegetation. In sculptural treatment, Dragutin Aleksić's work has a touch of art brut, or more precisely, is on the borderline between naïve art and art brut.

== Exhibitions and awards ==
He had his first exhibition in 1970 and he participated in individual and group shows in the country and abroad. The greatest collection of his sculptures is at Museum of Naïve and Marginal Art (MNMA), Jagodina, Serbia. He received many domestic and international awards for his work.

== Gallery ==
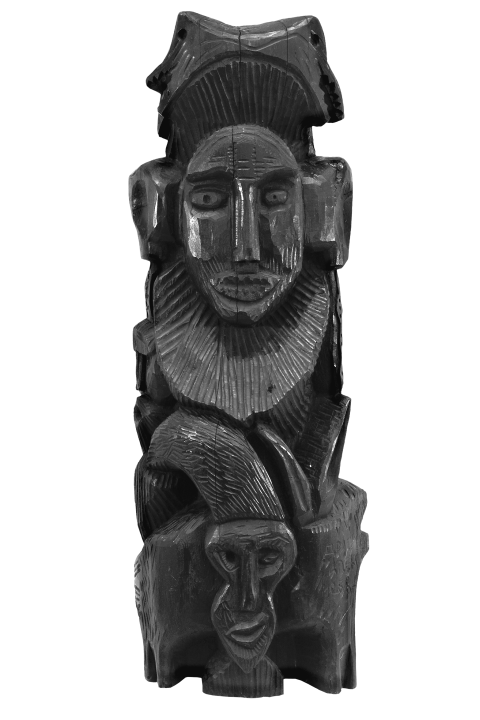
Sad Master, 1968,
wood, height 100 cm, MNMA, Jagodina

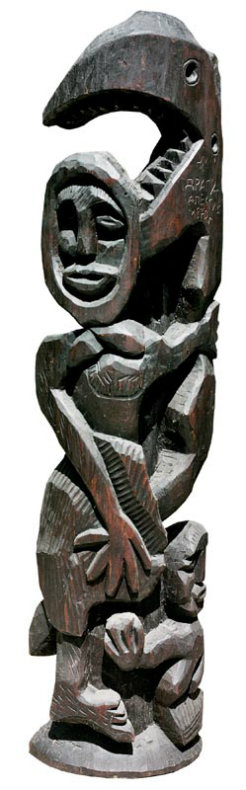
Unhappy Mother, 1970,
wood, height 140 cm, MNMA, Jagodina

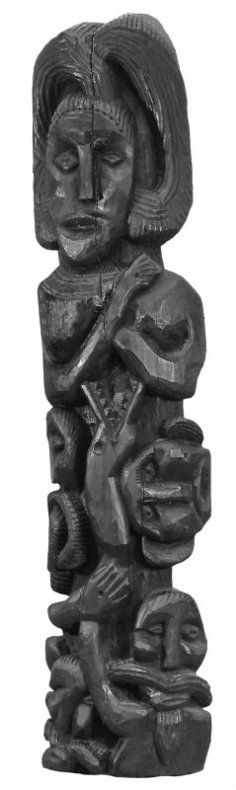
Unhappy Bride, n. a,
wood, height 155 cm, MNMA, Jagodina

== Literature ==
- М. Бошковић; М. Маширевић, Самоуки ликовни уметници у Србији, Торино, 1977
- Ото Бихаљи-Мерин; Небојша – Бато Томашевић, Енциклопедија наивне уметности света, Београд, 1984
- Н. Крстић, Наивна уметност Србије, САНУ, МНМУ, Јагодина, 2003
- Љ. Којић, Драгутин Алексић, монографија, МНМУ, Јагодина, 2006
- Н. Крстић, Наивна и маргинална уметност Србије, МНМУ, Јагодина, 2007
- N. Krstić, Outsiders, catalogue, MNMU, Jagodina, 2013
