= Bare (Despotovac) =

Coordinates: 44.0538°N 21.6045°E

- Village
- Interactive map of Bare
- Country: Serbia
- Municipality: Despotovac
- Time zone: UTC+1 (CET)
  - Summer (DST): UTC+2 (CEST)

Bare (Serbian Cyrillic: Баре) is a village situated in Despotovac municipality in Serbia.
