= Resava School =

Serbian school

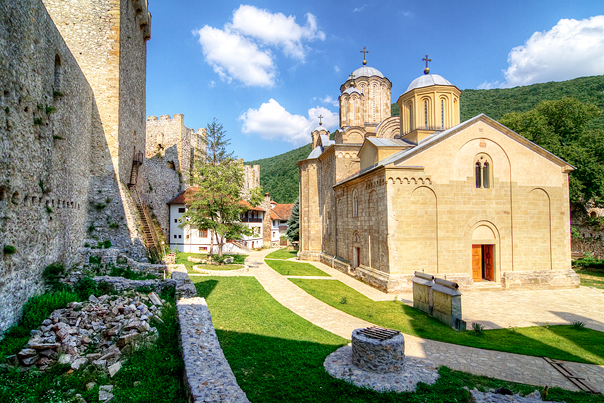
- The transcribing center was located inside the monastery walls

Monastery information
- Full name: Ресавска школа Resavska škola
- Order: Serbian Orthodox
- Established: 1407
- Disestablished: 1438

People
- Founder: Stefan Lazarević

Site
- Location: Despotovac, Serbia
- Public access: manasija.rs

Resava School (Serbian: Ресавска школа / Resavska škola), was founded in 1407 by Serbian despot Stefan Lazarević. Based on his endowment, the Manasija Monastery was called Bašta znanja (Serbian Cyrillic: Башта знања) or the "bastion of knowledge" for learning, writing, translating, transcribing, drawing, painting, and illuminating manuscripts in the Serbian Despotate. One of the main supporters of the Resava School was Constantine the Philosopher (Константин Филозоф / Konstantin Filozof), also known as Constantine of Kostenets. The canon of this school was followed in monasteries of Hilandar, Patriarchate of Peć, Visoki Dečani and Ljubostinja, and its influences were present in Russia, Bulgaria, Macedonia, and Romania. Monastery of Manasija, also called Resava, had a library of more than 20,000 books.

== See also ==
- Gabriel the Hilandarian
- Gregory Tsamblak
- Isaija the Monk
- Venedikt Crepović
