= Momčilo Vuksanović (Serbian politician) =

Serbian politician

Momčilo Vuksanović (Serbian Cyrillic: Момчило Вуксановић; born 26 September 1952), also known as Moma Brada, is a painter and politician in Serbia. He has been a member of the National Assembly of Serbia since 3 November 2021, serving with the Party of United Pensioners of Serbia (Partija ujedinjenih penzionera Srbije, PUPS).

== Early life and career ==
Vuksanović was born in the village of Miliva in the municipality of Despotovac, in what was then the People's Republic of Serbia in the Federal People's Republic of Yugoslavia. He was initially educated as an economist. In 1970 he became a painter. He began working in the field of religious iconography in 1992 and has since had several exhibits in the field. Since 1993, he has been active with the Days of Serbian Spiritual Transformation festival in Despotovac.

== Politician ==
=== At the republic level ===
The PUPS contested the 2007 Serbian parliamentary election on a combined electoral list with the Social Democratic Party (Socijaldemokratska partija, SDP), and Vuksanović was included on the list in the thirty-ninth position. From 2000 to 2011, mandates in Serbian parliamentary elections were awarded to sponsoring parties or coalitions rather than individual candidates, and it was common practice for the mandates to be distributed out of numerical order. Vuksanović's specific list position had no formal bearing on his chances of election; in any event, the list did not cross the electoral threshold to win representation in the assembly. The PUPS subsequently aligned itself with the Socialist Party of Serbia (Socijalistička partija Srbije, SPS) for the 2008 parliamentary election, and Vuksanović appeared in the fifty-fourth position on the latter party's coalition list. The list won twenty mandates, and he did not serve in the parliament that followed.

Serbia's electoral system was reformed in 2011, such that mandates were awarded in numerical order to candidates on successful lists. Vuksanović was included in the fifty-second position on the SPS's list for both the 2012 and 2014 parliamentary elections and narrowly missed election when the list won forty-four mandates each time. He was not able to enter the assembly in this period as the replacement for another party member.

The PUPS shifted its alliance to the Serbian Progressive Party (Srpska napredna stranka, SNS) prior to the 2016 Serbian parliamentary election, and Vuksanović appeared in the 245th position (out of 250) on the SNS's Aleksandar Vučić – Serbia Is Winning list. This was too low for direct election to be a realistic prospect, and indeed he was not directly elected when the list won 131 mandates. He was the next PUPS candidate in line to receive a mandate when the parliament dissolved in 2020.

Vuksanović was given the 231st position on the SNS's successor Aleksandar Vučić – For Our Children list for the 2020 parliamentary election and again missed election when the list won a landslide victory with 188 mandates. He received a mandate in late 2021 as a replacement for Đuro Perić, who had died in office. Vuksanović officially became a member of the assembly on 3 November 2021.

=== Municipal politics ===
Vuksanović appeared in the seventh position on the SPS's list in Despotovac in the 2012 Serbian local elections and missed direct election when the list won seven mandates. He entered the local assembly as the replacement for another PUPS member on 14 May 2013. He was subsequently given the seventh position on the SNS's list for the 2016 local elections and was re-elected when the list won twenty-five mandates. He did not seek re-election at the municipal level in 2020.
