= Nebojša Pavković =

Serbian army general (1946–2025)

Colonel general Nebojša Pavković Небојша Павковић
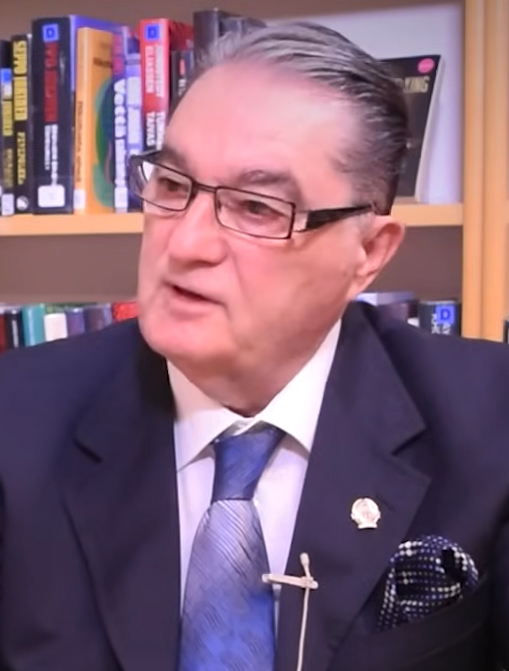
- Pavković in 2018
- Born: 10 April 1946; Senjski Rudnik, PR Serbia, FPR Yugoslavia
- Died: 20 October 2025 (aged 79); Belgrade, Serbia
- Military career
- Allegiance: SFR Yugoslavia (1970–1992); FR Yugoslavia (1992–2002)
- Branch: Yugoslav People's Army (1970–1992); Yugoslav Army (1992–2002)
- Service years: 1970–2002
- Rank: Colonel general
- Commands: Chief of the General Staff
- Conflicts: Yugoslav wars; Croatian war of independence; Battle of Vukovar; Kosovo war; Battle of Lođa; Dečani operation; KLA Summer offensive (1998); Battle of Paštrik; Mališevo offensive; Yugoslav offensive in Kosovo (1998); Yugoslav September Offensive; Central Drenica offensive; NATO bombing of Yugoslavia; Prizren incident (1999); Insurgency in the Preševo Valley; Battle of Šušaja; Operation Return (2001)
- Awards

Nebojša Pavković (Serbian Cyrillic: Небојша Павковић; 10 April 1946 – 20 October 2025) was a Serbian army general who served as Chief of the General Staff of the Armed Forces of Yugoslavia from February 2000 to June 2002. He also served as the Commander of Third Army of the Ground Forces of Yugoslavia during the Kosovo War, from December 1998 to February 2000. In 2009, Pavković was convicted by the ICTY of war crimes during the Kosovo War and sentenced to 22 years in prison.

== Life and career ==
Pavković was born in the village of Senjski Rudnik in the municipality of Despotovac on 10 April 1946. He finished teacher training college in Aleksinac in 1966, and was conscripted into the Yugoslav People's Army on 20 July 1970. Pavković graduated from the Military Academy in Belgrade in 1970, finished junior officers' school in 1982 and senior officers' school in 1988. He served as a battalion commander within the 10th Infantry Brigade and later headed the 16th Proletarian Infantry Regiment. From 1988 to 1989, he was the commander of the 16th Motorized Brigade. Between 1988 and 1993, he held several posts in the Federal Secretariat for National Defence.

When the conflict in Kosovo began, Pavković was the Commander of the Third Army. He was promoted to the rank of Major General in 1996, Lieutenant General in 1998 and Colonel General in 1999. For success as commander leadership he received numerous medals and awards; Slobodan Milošević awarded him the Order of Freedom for commanding the Third Army during the NATO bombing of Yugoslavia. After the overthrow of Milošević, Pavković remained at his position as Chief of the General Staff until 24 June 2002, when he was removed from his position by the President of FR Yugoslavia Vojislav Koštunica.

He published two books, which covered events which led to the Kosovo War and military events during the NATO bombing of Yugoslavia on the Kosovo battlefield.

=== ICTY trial, sentence and death ===
On 25 April 2005, Pavković was surrendered to the International Criminal Tribunal for the Former Yugoslavia (ICTY) in The Hague where he was charged with committing crimes against humanity and war crimes during the Kosovo War. On 26 February 2009, the ICTY convicted Pavković of the charges and sentenced him to 22 years in prison. His sentence was upheld in January 2014.

Pavković served his sentence in Kylmäkoski, Finland, from 2014. In September 2025, he was transferred to Serbia due to health reasons. He died in Belgrade the following month, on 20 October, at the age of 79.

== Publications ==
- The smell of gunpowder and death in Kosovo and Metohija in 1998 (Serbian Cyrillic: Мирис барута и смрти на Косову и Метохији 1998.) (2015)
- The Third Battalion in "Merciful Angel's" Embrace for 78 Days (Serbian Cyrillic: Трећа армија 78 дана у загрљају Милосрдног анђела) (2018)

== Notes ==
Military offices
Preceded by Dragoljub Ojdanić	Chief of the General Staff of the Armed Forces of Yugoslavia; 7 February 2000 – 24 June 2002	Succeeded by Branko Krga
