= Medveđa (disambiguation) =

Medveđa is a municipality in Serbia.

It may also refer to:

- Medveđa (Despotovac), a village in Serbia
- Medveđa (Trstenik), a village in Serbia
