= Vojnik =

Vojnik may refer to:

- Municipality of Vojnik, a municipality in Slovenia
- Vojnik, Vojnik, a town in the Municipality of Vojnik, Slovenia
- Vojnik (mountain) , a mountain north of Nikšić, Montenegro
- Vojnik (Despotovac), a village in the Municipality of Despotovac, Serbia

== See also ==
- Vojníkov, Czech Republic
- Vojnić, Croatia
- Wojnicz, Poland
