= Momčilo Vuksanović =

Momčilo Vuksanović may refer to:

- Momčilo Vuksanović (Montenegrin politician)
- Momčilo Vuksanović (Serbian politician)
