= Lipovica, Despotovac =

Village in Pomoravlje, Serbia

Lipovica Липовица
- Village
- Location within Serbia
- Coordinates: 44°09′19″N 21°32′16″E
- Country: Serbia
- District: Pomoravlje
- Municipality: Despotovac

Area
  - Total: 12.63 km^{2} (4.88 sq mi)
- Elevation: 449 m (1,473 ft)

Population (2022)
  - Total: 381
  - Density: 30.2/km^{2} (78.1/sq mi)
- Area code: 035

Lipovica (Serbian Cyrillic: Липовица) is a village in Despotovac municipality, in the Pomoravlje District of Serbia. As of the year 2022, it has a total population of 381.

== Geography ==
Lipovica is located along the state road 186. Its average elevation is 449 meters above the sea level.
