= Bogava =

Coordinates: 44.0950°N 21.3256°E

- Village
- Interactive map of Bogava
- Country: Serbia
- Municipality: Despotovac

Government

Population (2022)
  - Total: 345
- Time zone: UTC+1 (CET)
  - Summer (DST): UTC+2 (CEST)

Bogava (Serbian Cyrillic: Богава) is a village situated in Despotovac municipality in Serbia. As of 2022, the population is 345.
