= Bukovac, Despotovac =

Bukovac Буковац
- Village
- Location within Serbia
- Coordinates: 44°07′04″N 21°28′09″E
- Country: Serbia
- District: Pomoravlje

Population (2022)
  - Total: 305
- Time zone: UTC+1 (CET)
  - Summer (DST): UTC+2 (CEST)

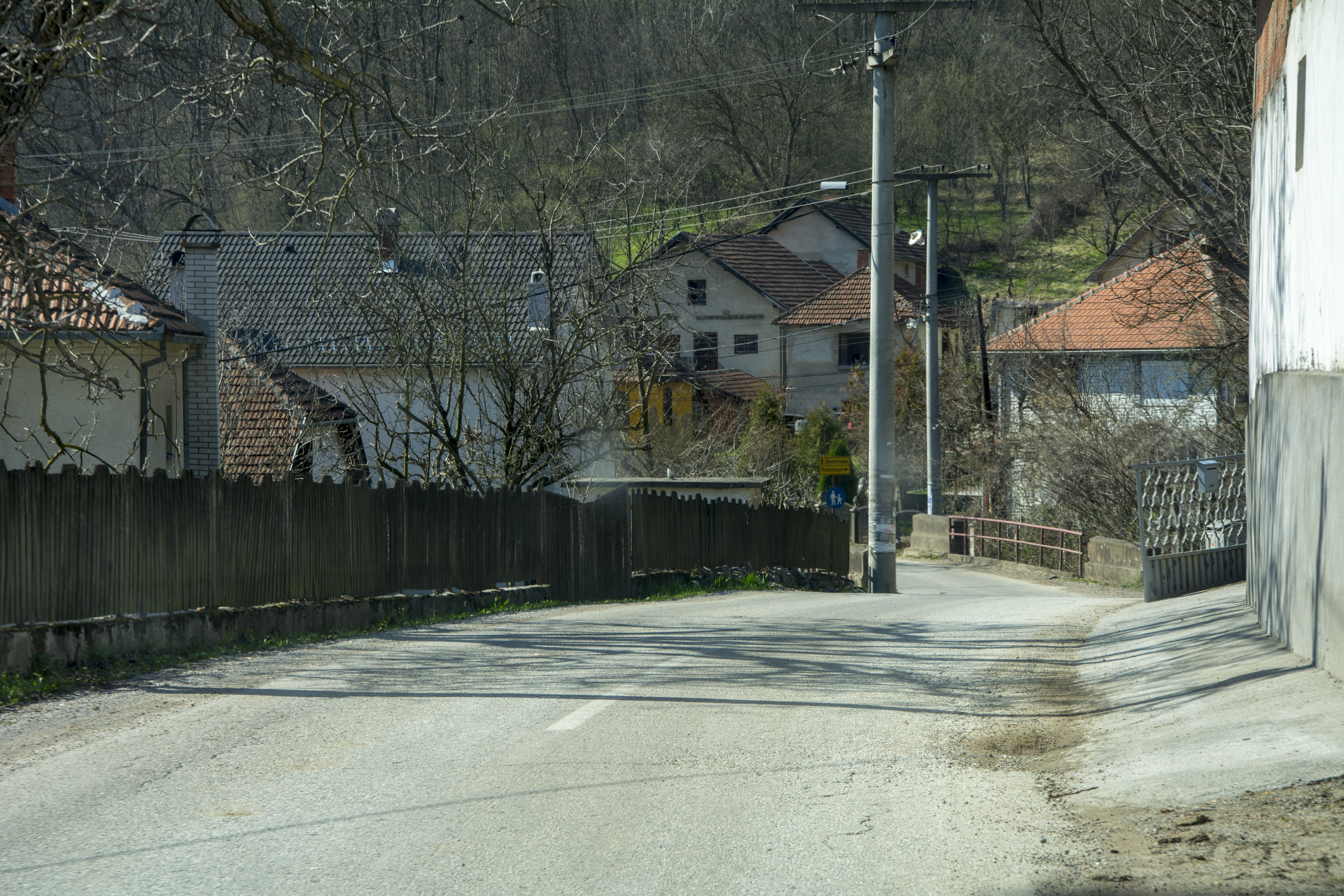

Bukovac (Serbian: Буковац) is a village in the Despotovac municipality, in the Pomoravlje District of Serbia. As of 2022, the population is 305.
