= Grabovica, Despotovac =

Grabovica
- Village
- Location within Serbia
- Country: Serbia
- Municipality: Despotovac
- Time zone: UTC+1 (CET)
  - Summer (DST): UTC+2 (CEST)

Grabovica (Serbian Cyrillic: Грабовица) is a village situated in Despotovac municipality in Serbia.
