= Popovnjak =

Coordinates: 44°03′54″N 21°30′30″E

- Village
- Interactive map of Popovnjak
- Country: Serbia
- Municipality: Despotovac
- Time zone: UTC+1 (CET)
  - Summer (DST): UTC+2 (CEST)

Popovnjak (Serbian Cyrillic: Поповњак) is a village situated in Despotovac municipality in Serbia. The census data at 2022, it has a population of around 216 residents.
