= Židilje =

Coordinates: 44.0519°N 21.5650°E

Židilje Жидије
- Village
- Interactive map of Židilje
- Country: Serbia
- Municipality: Despotovac

Population (2022)
  - Total: 39
- Time zone: UTC+1 (CET)
  - Summer (DST): UTC+2 (CEST)

Židilje is a village situated in Despotovac municipality in Serbia. As of 2022, the population is 39.
