= Panjevac =

Coordinates: 44.1300°N 21.5267°E

- Village
- Interactive map of Panjevac
- Country: Serbia
- Municipality: Despotovac
- Time zone: UTC+1 (CET)
  - Summer (DST): UTC+2 (CEST)

Panjevac (Serbian Cyrillic: Пањевац) is a village situated in Despotovac municipality in Serbia.
