= Senjski Rudnik =

Senjski Rudnik Сењски Рудник
- Village
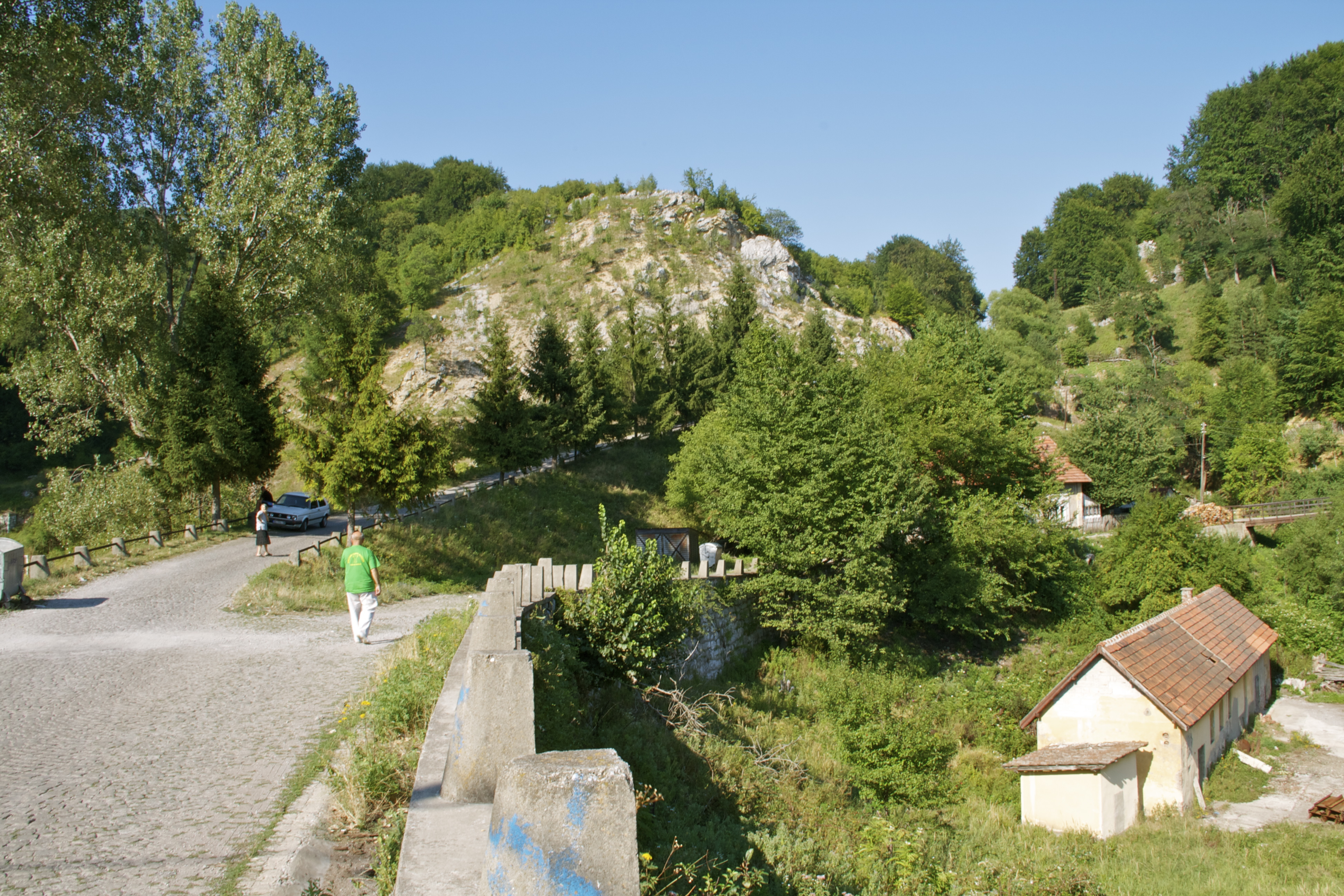
- Senjski Rudnik landscape

- Location within Serbia
- Coordinates: 43°59′46″N 21°34′09″E
- Country: Serbia
- District: Pomoravlje District
- Municipality: Despotovac

Area
  - Total: 18.76 km^{2} (7.24 sq mi)
- Elevation: 666 m (2,185 ft)

Population (2011)
  - Total: 438
  - Density: 23.3/km^{2} (60.5/sq mi)
- Time zone: UTC+1 (CET)
  - Summer (DST): UTC+2 (CEST)

Senjski Rudnik (Serbian Cyrillic: Сењски Рудник) is a village located in the municipality of Despotovac, eastern Serbia. According to the 2011 census, it had a population of 438 inhabitants. It is the site of the oldest preserved coal mine in Serbia, established in 1853. The mine marks the beginnings of the Industrial Revolution in Serbia.

== History ==
The coal mine was opened on 11 July 1853 and was operational for almost 120 years. On 13 July 1903, the first mining trade union organization in Serbia was founded in Senjski Rudnik, and already on 6 August they organized the general strike which ended after 9 days with the management accepting to raise wages and to improve working conditions. In 1955, the 6 August was declared a national miners' day.

On 21 July 1893, Saint Procopius Day, protector of the miners, there was an accident in the mine. A forest fire spread to the shaft, killing the entire shift of miners. Their bodies were never recovered.

In 1923, the football club "Rudar" was founded. The cultural center Sokol House was established, which also operated as a cinema from 1934. After World War II, composer Darko Kraljić, future founder of the popular music in Yugoslavia, was sent to the center to organize the cultural and artistic life in the small town, which together with the neighboring Senje, after which it was named, had some 3,000 inhabitants. Kraljić's piano is exhibited in the local museum.

The village had an elementary school. Young engineers were having their practical education in the settlement and participated in economic life, so it was recorded that between 1955 and 1968, the only two major industrial branches which were not represented in Senjski Rudnik were aircraft industry and shipbuilding. There was a large hospital in the settlement, one of the best equipped in the state. Famous military surgeon Izidor Papo performed surgeries in it. However, the mine was soon closed.

In 1978, film Petria's Wreath, directed by Srđan Karanović and starring Mirjana Karanović, was filmed in Senjski Rudnik. The house where it was filmed is today known as the Petrija's House. It was renovated in 2023.

== Coal mining museum ==
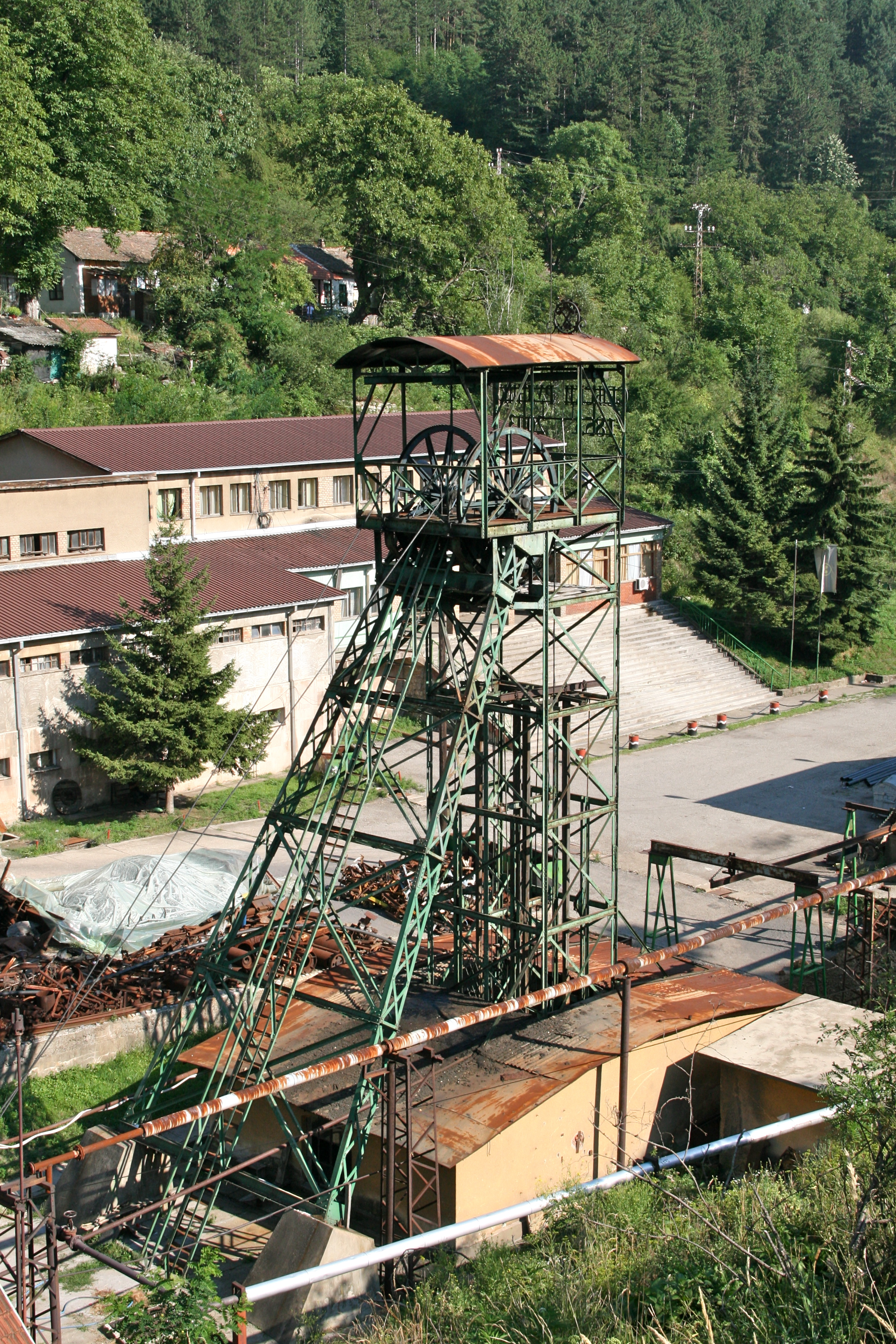
Remains of Senjski Rudnik coal mine

Coal mining museum was initially formed in 1980. As of 2010, there is an ongoing project, sponsored by the Council of Europe and the Ministry of Culture of Serbia, of restoration of preservation of the mine complex, which will turn the entire site into an open-air museum and historical heritage site.

By February 2018, the display included 1,000 exhibits and 5,000 photos and is organized as the Coal Mining Museum (Serbian: Музеј угљарства, romanized: Muzej ugljarstva). The industrial heritage complex includes:

- Main building; built in 1930, today it hosts the central exhibition which on two levels presents mining history in the region, from the 3rd century until today;
- Engineering workshop; built in 1920, it consists of four rooms, displaying the everyday life of the miners and their families; documents show that women worked as miners even decades before World War I, but especially during the war when men were drafted;
- Open-air exhibition; hosts exhibits too large for the indoors display: machines, apparatuses, cars, etc.
- Mining elevator; the only one of its kind remaining in the world, so it was placed under the state protection; it is still operational; the hoist was constructed in 1872 in Graz, Austria, has hornbeam gear wheels and is steam operated. It originally operated in the Vrdnik mine from 1874 to 1922, and when Vrdnik was flooded, it was relocated to Senjski Rudnik. It goes 150 m (490 ft) deep;
- "Aleksandar's underground mine"; the oldest entry into the mineshaft built in 1860 and completely preserved, and the administrative building above the entry;
- "Sokol house"; built in 1930, the first Worker's council in Serbia was formed in it on 28 January 1950;
- Church of the Saint Procopius; built in 1900 in memory of the dead miners from the 1893 fire;
- Radnička and Činovnička streets;
- House of Petrija;
- Elementary school "Dositej Obradović"; built in 1896;
- Lebanese cedar park; named after the Lebanese cedar tree brought from the Mount Athos in 1903;
- Replica of the steam locomotive, a reminder of the narrow-gauge railway for the coal transport to the town of Ćuprija. It was discontinued in the 1960s;

Future additions include the underground museum and restoration of the miners' restaurant which will be used by the tourists. The underground section of the museum is a 530 m (1,740 ft) long abandoned mineshaft. Project is based on the similar facilities in Velenje, Slovenia and Bochum, Germany. The exhibition will be interactive and the visitors would leave the shaft via original mining elevator.

In the close vicinity of the museum are the monasteries of Ravanica and Manasija, the Resava Cave and the Lisine waterfall.

== Notable people ==
- Nebojša Pavković, former Chief of the General Staff of Armed Forces of FR Yugoslavia
