= Mališevo offensive =

- Part of the Kosovo War
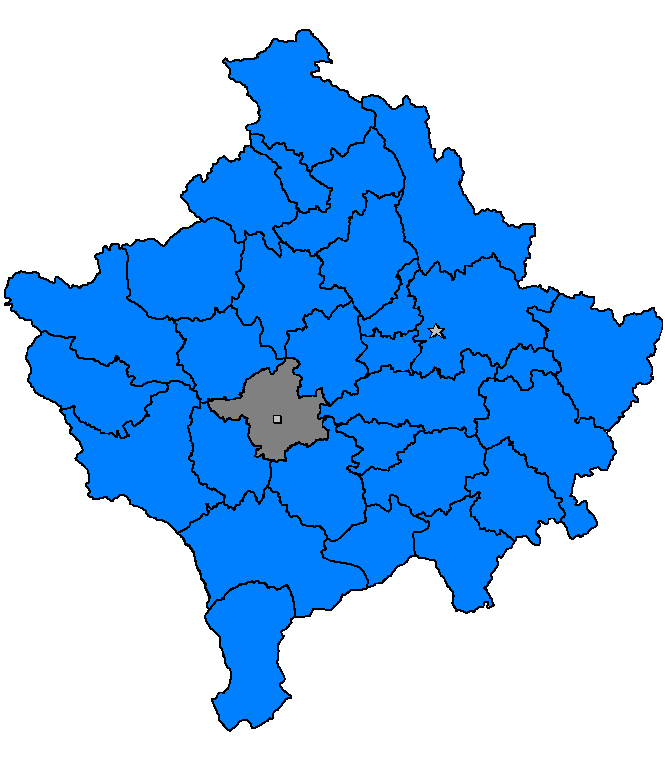
Date	29 July 1998
Location	Mališevo, FR Yugoslavia, Kosovo and Metohija
Result	Yugoslav victory
Territorial changes	Mališevo is retaken by Yugoslav forces

Belligerents
FR Yugoslavia	Kosovo Liberation Army

Commanders and leaders
(Federal Republic of Yugoslavia) Slobodan Milošević (Federal Republic of Yugoslavia) Nebojša Pavković	Ramush Haradinaj

Units involved
Yugoslav Armed Forces • MUP	Drenica Operational Zone; Mujahideen units

Strength
(Federal Republic of Yugoslavia) Unknown	Unknown; Small contingent

Casualties and losses
(Federal Republic of Yugoslavia) 2 officers killed	Unknown
- Over 17 Albanian civilians killed 10 nearby villages are bombarded by the Yugoslav Air Force; 10,000 Albanians displaced

The Mališevo offensive was a large-scale offensive conducted by the Yugoslav forces in the town of Mališevo on 29 July 1998 during the Kosovo War. The offensive had been ordered by Slobodan Milošević, the Serbian President at the time. The town was a KLA stronghold since June, and under their control, the local Serb population was being oppressed.

In 2005, a mass grave was found in the town containing 12 Serb and one Bulgarian civilian.

== Prelude ==
During the early stages of the Kosovo War, Mališevo was a major stronghold for the Kosovo Liberation Army (KLA) who used it as a base for communication across central Kosovo. It was heavily protected and no firefights occurred prior to the Yugoslav offensive. On 29 July 1998, Yugoslav Forces under command of President Slobodan Milošević launched an offensive to re-take the town from the KLA and secure additional military victories.

== The operation ==
On 29 July, Serbian forces encircled the town and started heavy shelling. After some fighting, Serbian police entered the town and started setting houses and other infrastructure on fire. Meanwhile, the KLA was forced to withdraw further. After additional fighting, the KLA withdrew completely due to constant shelling and encirclement. By nighttime, the KLA had entirely pulled out from the area. Milošević stated that aid would be sent to fix the town's infrastructure but did not allow any foreign media outlets to come to the scene and take videos for documentation. During the fights, the Albanian population of the village had mostly fled.

== Aftermath ==
After the town was recaptured from the KLA, the United Nations High Commissioner for Refugees (UNHCR) requested to send aid. Milosevic claimed that refugees who fled Mališevo could return safely, but the townspeople had no homes to return to, given that most of the houses were set on fire after the Serbian police crackdown on the Albanian militants. The chief of UNHCR's Kosovo operation, Thomas Vargas, stated that refugees were hiding out in the mountains: "They're living virtually in the forests on the hillsides, in the mountainside, sleeping under trees, terrified where they are now, but even more terrified to go home. And when they see their villages up in smoke in the distance, it doesn't give them much confidence. They don't have any security to get back home anytime soon." Vargas further added that the refugee situation across the province had become "desperate". Continued fighting between ethnic Albanian refugees and Serbian forces halted plans to send an international aid convoy to the devastated former rebel stronghold. After Yugoslav withdrawal from Kosovo, the KLA returned in Mališevo in October, returning to the ten villages around the town and later ambushed Serb policemen in the town. By late October, the KLA was reported to have rebuilt their own secondary military checkpoint near the town. By November 11, the KLA returned to Mališevo.
