= Branko Krga =

Serbian military officer

General Branko Krga
- Serbian Cyrillic: Бранко Крга
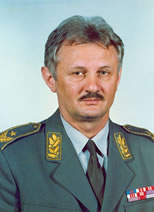
- Branko Krga as General-major (date unknown)
- Born: 18 February 1945 (age 81); Daruvar, Independent State of Croatia SR Croatia, SFR Yugoslavia
- Military career
- Allegiance: Yugoslavia; Serbia and Montenegro
- Branch: Yugoslav People's Army; Armed Forces of Serbia and Montenegro
- Service years: 1967–2005
- Rank: Colonel general
- Units: Yugoslav Ground Forces; Ground Forces of Serbia and Montenegro
- Commands: Chief of the General Staff
- Conflicts: Kosovo War

Branko Krga (Serbian Cyrillic: Бранко Крга; born 18 February 1945) is a retired Serbian military officer, who served as the Chief of the General Staff of the Armed Forces of Serbia and Montenegro from 24 June 2002 to 23 December 2004.

Military offices
Preceded by Nebojša Pavković	Chief of the General Staff of the Armed Forces of Serbia and Montenegro; 24 June 2002 – 23 December 2004	Succeeded by Dragan Paskaš
