= Trućevac =

Village in Pomoravlje District, Serbia

Coordinates: 44.0778°N 21.3800°E

Trućevac Трућевац
- Village
- Interactive map of Trućevac
- Country: Serbia
- Municipality: Despotovac
- Time zone: UTC+1 (CET)
  - Summer (DST): UTC+2 (CEST)

Trućevac is a village situated in Despotovac municipality in Serbia.
