= Jezero (Despotovac) =

Coordinates: 44°2′N 21°30′E

- Village
- Interactive map of Jezero
- Country: Serbia
- Municipality: Despotovac
- Time zone: UTC+1 (CET)
  - Summer (DST): UTC+2 (CEST)

Jezero (Serbian Cyrillic: Језеро) is a village situated in Despotovac municipality in Serbia. At the time of the 2011 census, there were 367 inhabitants. This has decreased from a high of around 770 in 1953.
