= Vitance =

Coordinates: 44.0942°N 21.4003°E

Vitance Витанце
- Village
- Interactive map of Vitance
- Country: Serbia
- Municipality: Despotovac

Population (2022)
  - Total: 552
- Time zone: UTC+1 (CET)
  - Summer (DST): UTC+2 (CEST)

Vitance is a village situated in Despotovac municipality in Serbia. As of 2022, the population is 552.
