= Jasenovo (Despotovac) =

Coordinates: 44.1506°N 21.3092°E

- Village
- Interactive map of Jasenovo
- Country: Serbia
- Municipality: Despotovac
- Time zone: UTC+1 (CET)
  - Summer (DST): UTC+2 (CEST)

Jasenovo (Serbian Cyrillic: Јасеново) is a village situated in Despotovac municipality in Serbia.
