= Zlatovo =

Coordinates: 44.2056°N 21.4383°E

- Village
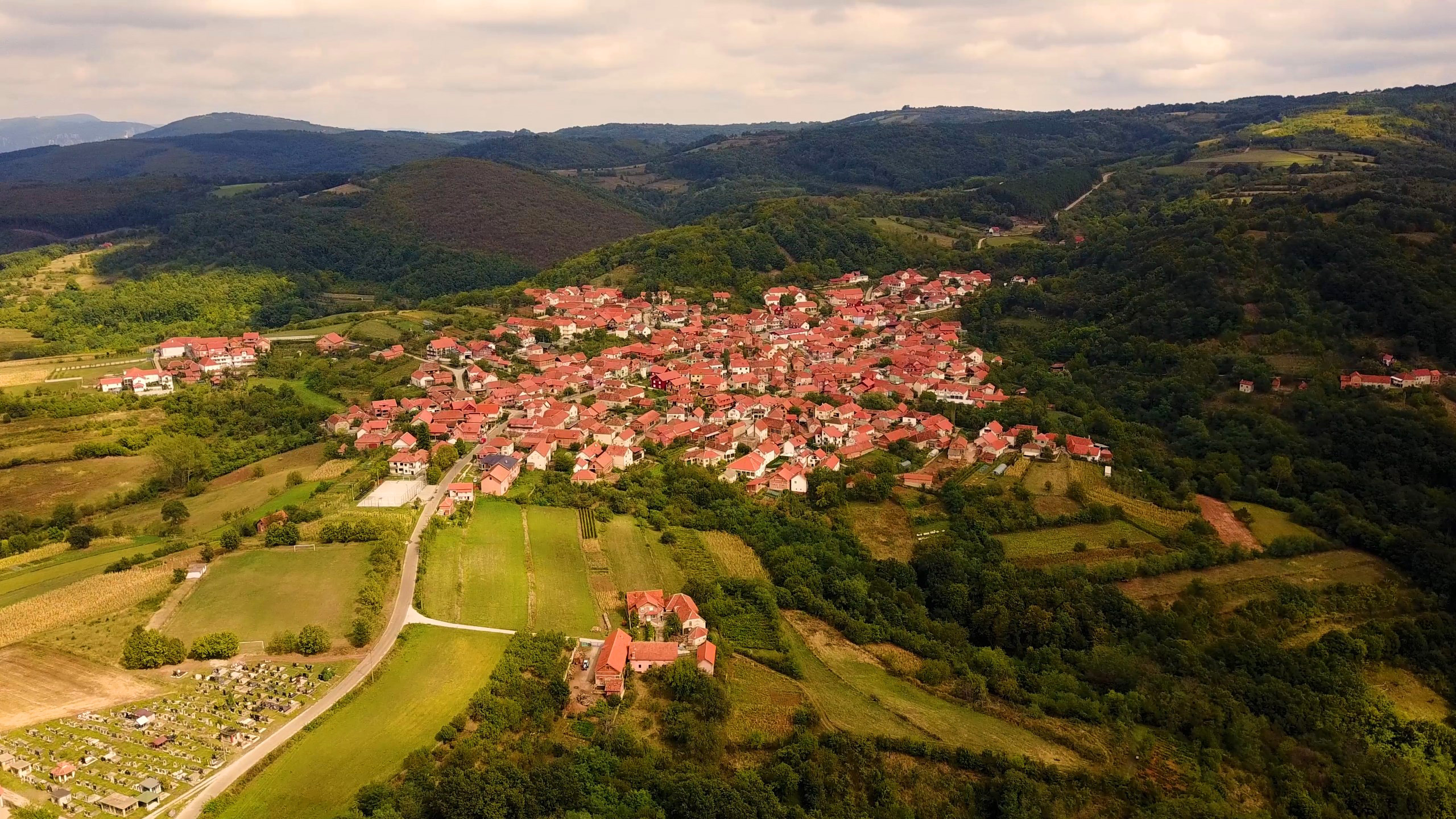
- Interactive map of Zlatovo
- Country: Serbia
- Municipality: Despotovac

Population (2022)
  - Total: 509
- Time zone: UTC+1 (CET)
  - Summer (DST): UTC+2 (CEST)

Zlatovo is a village situated in Despotovac municipality in Serbia. People in Zlatovo are mainly working on farms and producing corn. As of 2022, the population is 509.
