= Strmosten =

Strmosten Стрмостен
- Village
- Interactive map of Strmosten
- Country: Serbia
- Time zone: UTC+1 (CET)
  - Summer (DST): UTC+2 (CEST)

Strmosten (Serbian Cyrillic: Стрмостен) is a village situated in Despotovac municipality in Serbia.

== Waterfall ==
Near the village Strmosten, located on the Resava River there is waterfall Lisine or Veliki Buk, standing 25 meters high, Lisine is one of the highest waterfalls in Serbia.
