= Medveđa (Despotovac) =

Coordinates: 44°09′04″N 21°20′32″E

Medveđa Медвеђа
- Village
- Interactive map of Medveđa
- Country: Serbia
- Municipality: Despotovac
- Time zone: UTC+1 (CET)
  - Summer (DST): UTC+2 (CEST)

Medveđa (Serbian Cyrillic: Медвеђа) is a village situated in Despotovac municipality in Serbia.
