= Ravna Reka (Despotovac) =

Coordinates: 44.0167°N 21.6167°E

- Village
- Interactive map of Ravna Reka
- Country: Serbia
- Municipality: Despotovac
- Time zone: UTC+1 (CET)
  - Summer (DST): UTC+2 (CEST)

Ravna Reka (Serbian Cyrillic: Равна Река) is a village situated in Despotovac municipality in Serbia.
