= Resavica (village) =

Coordinates: 44.069212°N 21.516937°E

Resavica Ресавица
- Village
- Interactive map of Resavica
- Country: Serbia
- Municipality: Despotovac
- Time zone: UTC+1 (CET)
  - Summer (DST): UTC+2 (CEST)

Resavica (Serbian Cyrillic: Ресавица) is a village situated in Despotovac municipality in Serbia.
