= Balajnac (Merošina) =

Balajnac Балајнац
- Village
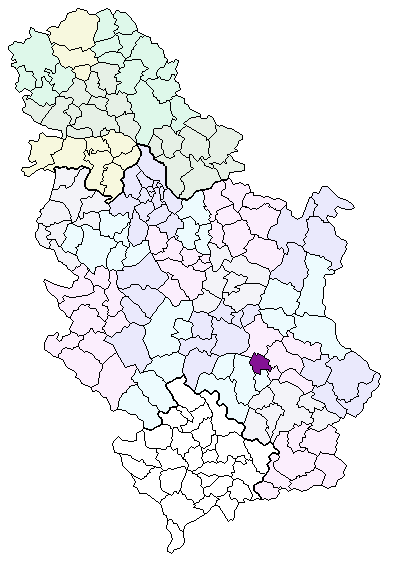
- Location of Merošina municipality in Serbia

- Location within Serbia
- Country: Serbia
- District: Nišava
- Municipality: Merošina

Population (1991)
  - Total: 1,249
- Time zone: UTC+1 (CET)
  - Summer (DST): UTC+2 (CEST)

Balajnac is a village in Serbia in the municipality Merošina in Nisava district. According to the census of 1991, there were 1,249 inhabitants.

== Demographics ==
Balajnac has a population of 944 adult inhabitants, and the average age is 40.1 years (39.5 for men and 40.7 for women). The village has 302 households, and the average number of members per household is 4.09.

According to the 2002 census, the village is mainly inhabited by Serbs. Further, there was a decline in population in the last three censuses.
