= Miliva =

Coordinates: 44.1292°N 21.4275°E

- Village
- Interactive map of Miliva
- Country: Serbia
- Municipality: Despotovac
- Time zone: UTC+1 (CET)
  - Summer (DST): UTC+2 (CEST)

Miliva (Serbian Cyrillic: Милива) is a village situated in Despotovac municipality in Serbia.
