= Plažane =

Coordinates: 44.1439°N 21.4158°E

- Village
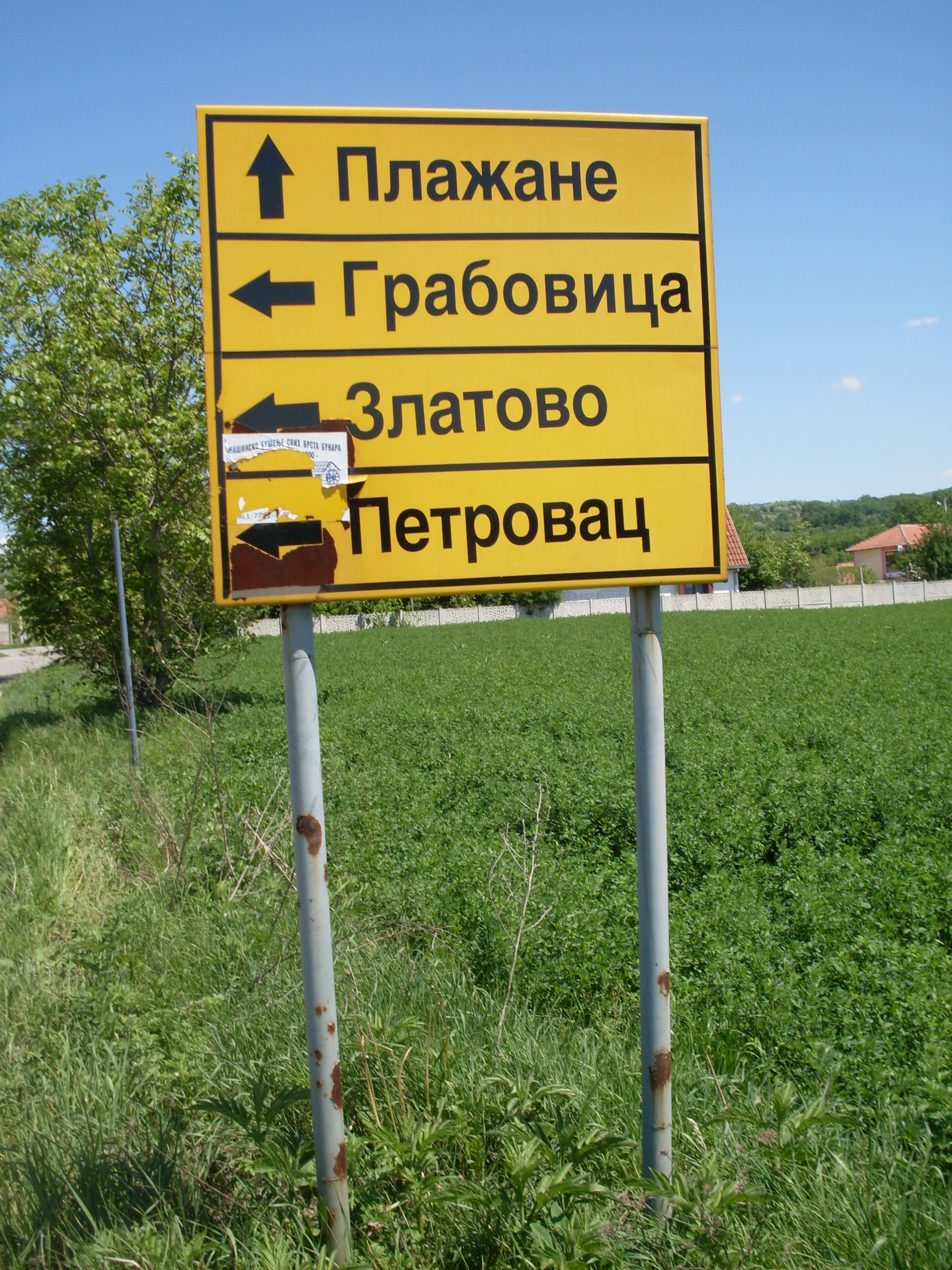
- Entrance to Plazane village near Despotovac
- Interactive map of Plažane
- Country: Serbia
- Municipality: Despotovac
- Time zone: UTC+1 (CET)
  - Summer (DST): UTC+2 (CEST)

Plažane (Serbian Cyrillic: Плажане) is a village situated in Despotovac municipality in Serbia.
