= Veliki Popović =

Coordinates: 44.1172°N 21.3603°E

Veliki Popović Велики Поповић
- Village
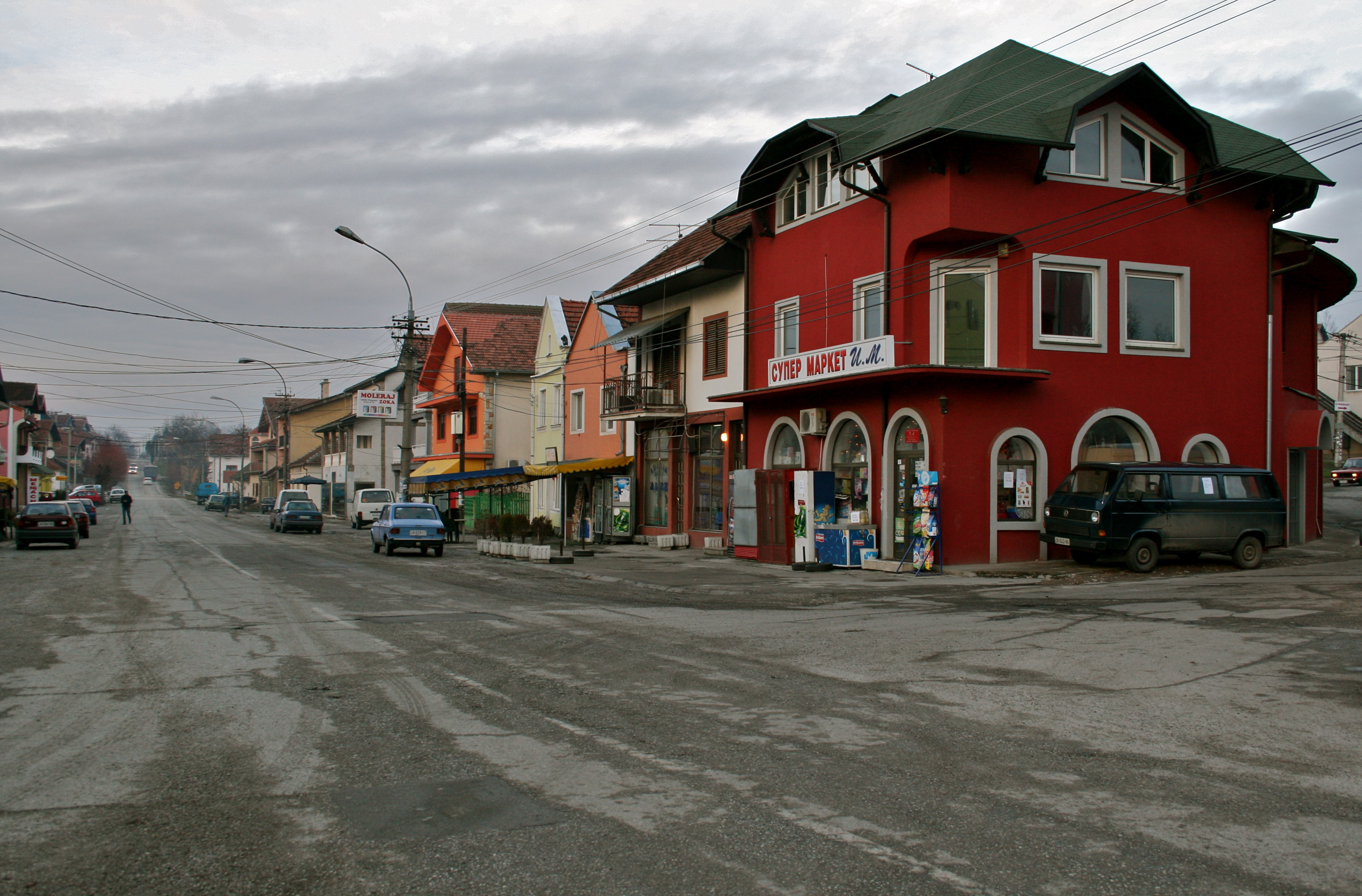
- Interactive map of Veliki Popović
- Country: Serbia
- Municipality: Despotovac
- Time zone: UTC+1 (CET)
  - Summer (DST): UTC+2 (CEST)

Veliki Popović is a village situated in Despotovac municipality in Serbia.
