= Jelovac =

Jelovac Јеловац
- Village
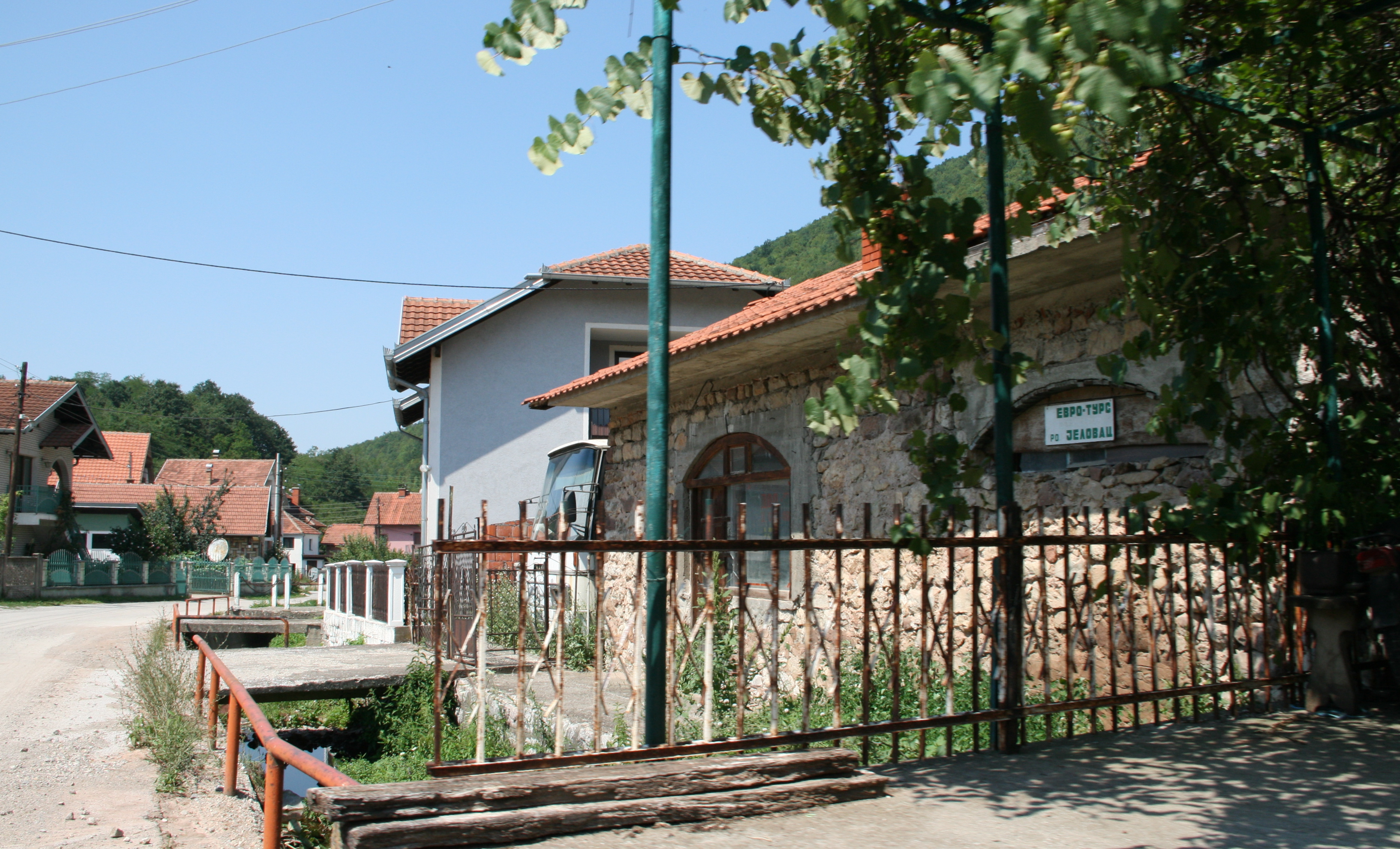

- Location within Serbia
- Coordinates: 44°05′09″N 21°35′10″E
- Country: Serbia
- Province: Šumadija and Western Serbia
- District: Pomoravlje District
- Municipality: Despotovac

Population (2011)
  - Total: 278
- Time zone: UTC+1 (CET)
  - Summer (DST): UTC+2 (CEST)

Jelovac (Serbian Cyrillic: Јеловац) is a village in Despotovac municipality, in the Pomoravlje District of Serbia.
