= Sladaja =

Sladaja Сладаја
- Interactive map of Sladaja
- Coordinates: 44°04′N 21°31′E
- Country: Serbia
- Municipality: Despotovac
- District: Pomoravlje
- Postal code: 35215
- Area code: 035

Sladaja (Serbian Cyrillic: Сладаја) is a village in Despotovac municipality, in the Pomoravlje District of Serbia.
