= Balajnac (Despotovac) =

Coordinates: 44.0897°N 21.3631°E

- Village
- Interactive map of Balajnac
- Country: Serbia
- Municipality: Despotovac

Population (2022)
  - Total: 310
- Time zone: UTC+1 (CET)
  - Summer (DST): UTC+2 (CEST)

Balajnac (Serbian Cyrillic: Балајнац) is a village situated in Despotovac municipality in Serbia. As of 2022, the population is 310.
