= Vojnik (Despotovac) =

Coordinates: 44.087886°N 21.445296°E

- Village
- Interactive map of Vojnik
- Country: Serbia
- Municipality: Despotovac

Population (2022)
  - Total: 692
- Time zone: UTC+1 (CET)
  - Summer (DST): UTC+2 (CEST)

Vojnik is a village situated in Despotovac municipality in Serbia. As of 2022, the population is 692.
