= Despotovac =

Town and municipality in Serbia

Despotovac Деспотовац (Serbian)
- Town and municipality
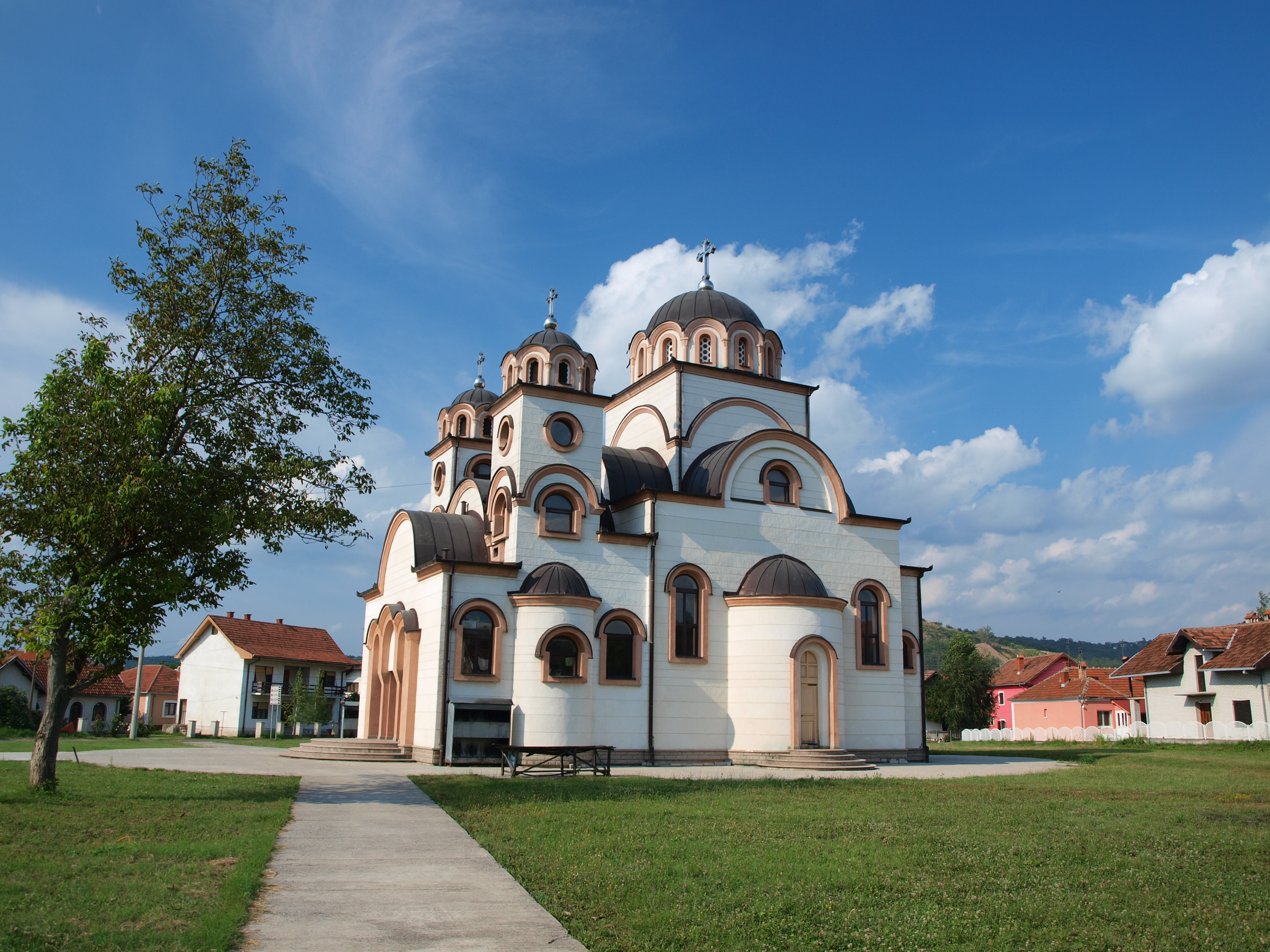
- Orthodox church in Despotovac

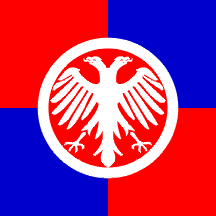
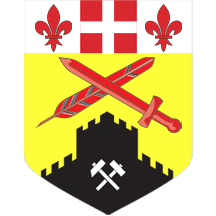
- Flag Coat of arms

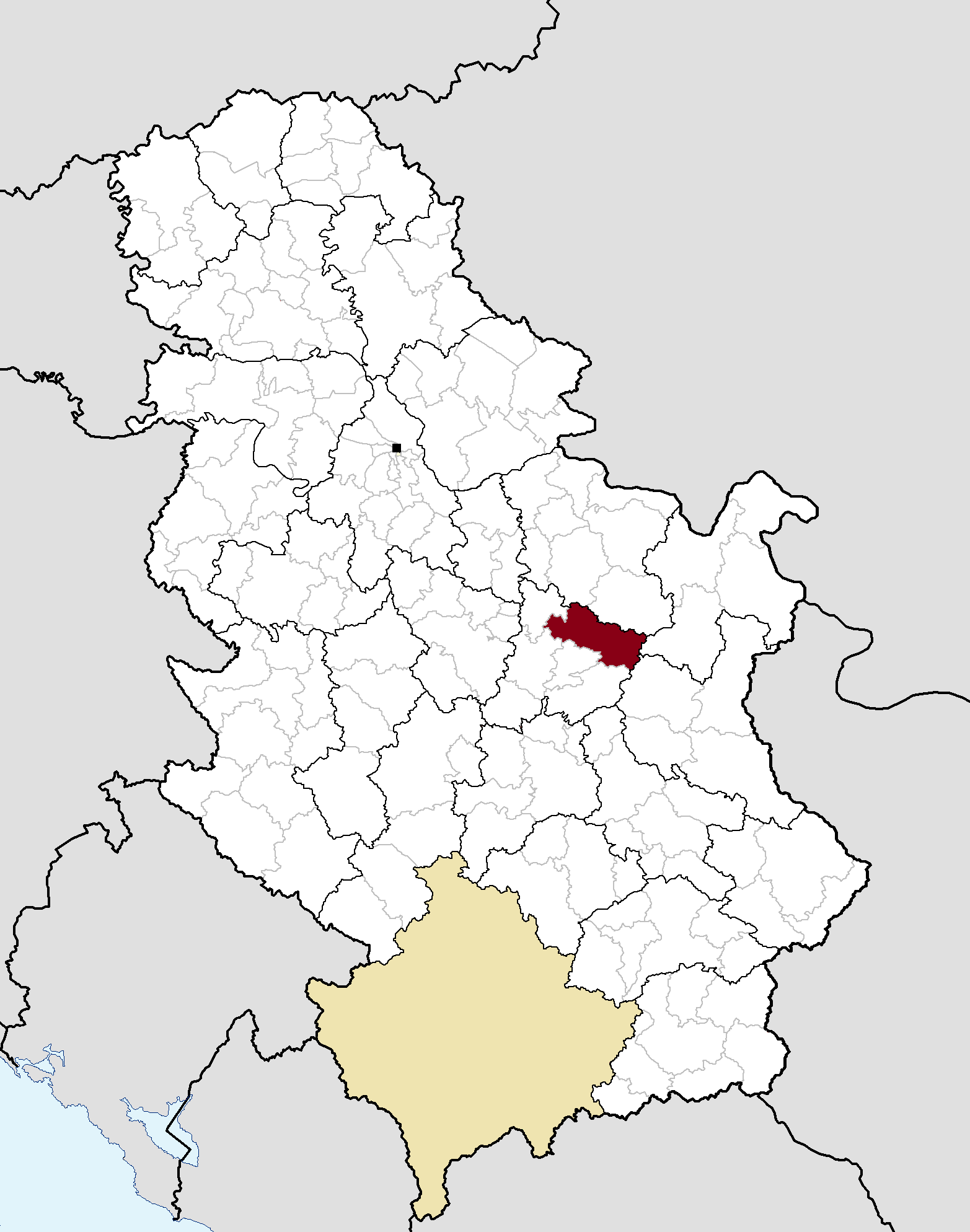
- Location of the municipality of Despotovac within Serbia
- Coordinates: 44°05′N 21°26′E
- Country: Serbia
- Region: Šumadija and Western Serbia
- District: Pomoravlje
- Settlements: 33

Government
  - Mayor: Zlatko Marjanović (SNS)

Area
  - Municipality: 623 km^{2} (241 sq mi)
- Elevation: 189 m (620 ft)

Population (2022 census)
  - Town: 3,595
  - Municipality: 18,278
- Time zone: UTC+1 (CET)
  - Summer (DST): UTC+2 (CEST)
- Postal code: 35213
- Area code: +381(0)35
- Car plates: DE
- Website: www.despotovac.rs

Despotovac (Serbian Cyrillic: Деспотовац) is a town and municipality located in the Pomoravlje District of central Serbia. It is situated 130 kilometers southeast of Belgrade. Its name stems from Despot, a title of Serbian medieval prince Stefan Lazarević. As of 2022 census, the town has a total population of 3,595, while the municipality has a population of 18,278.

== History ==
The Serb Orthodox monastery of Manasija was built between 1406-1418 and is one of the most significant monuments of Serbian culture, belonging to the "Resava school" (Serbian architecture)

From 1929 to 1941, Despotovac was part of the Morava Banovina of the Kingdom of Yugoslavia.

== Demographics ==
As of 2011 census results, the municipality had 22,995 inhabitants.

=== Ethnic groups ===
The ethnic composition of the municipality:

Ethnic group	Population	%
Serbs	21,602	93.15%
Vlachs	687	2.96%
Romani	244	1.05%
Romanians	38	0.16%
Montenegrins	21	0.09%
Macedonians	21	0.09%
Muslims	21	0.09%
Croats	20	0.09%
Albanians	18	0.08%
Yugoslavs	16	0.07%
Bulgarians	14	0.06%
Others	489	2.11%
Total	23,191	

== Settlements ==
Aside from the town of Despotovac, the municipality includes the following settlements:

- Balajnac
- Beljajka
- Bogava
- Brestovo
- Bukovac
- Despotovac (town)
- Vojnik
- Dvorište
- Grabovica
- Grčko Polje
- Jasenovo
- Jelovac
- Jezero
- Lipovica
- Lomnica
- Medveđa
- Miliva
- Panjevac
- Plažane
- Popovnjak
- Ravna Reka (mining town)
- Resavica (town)
- Resavica (village, also known as Dutovo)
- Senjski Rudnik (mining town)
- Sladaja
- Stenjevac
- Strmosten
- Trućevac
- Veliki Popović
- Vitance
- Vodna (mining settlement)
- Zlatovo
- Židilje

== Demographics ==
Historical population
Year	Pop.	±% p.a.
1948	33,262	—
1953	36,509	+1.88%
1961	38,389	+0.63%
1971	36,553	−0.49%
1981	35,690	−0.24%
1991	33,869	−0.52%
2002	25,611	−2.51%
2011	23,191	−1.10%
2022	18,278	−2.14%

As of 2022 census, the municipality of Despotovac has a total of 18,278 inhabitants.

== Economy ==
The mining company PEU Resavica, comprising several operating (coal) mines is headquartered in Despotovac. The following table shows the number of employed people by their core activity (as of 2017):

Activity	Total
Agriculture, forestry and fishing	105
Mining	1,299
Processing industry	391
Distribution of power, gas and water	35
Distribution of water and water waste management	71
Construction	120
Wholesale and retail, repair	518
Traffic, storage and communication	260
Hotels and restaurants	285
Media and telecommunications	26
Finance and insurance	33
Property stock and charter	5
Professional, scientific, innovative and technical activities	104
Administrative and other services	31
Administration and social assurance	261
Education	293
Healthcare and social work	338
Art, leisure and recreation	76
Other services	60
Total	4,311

== Notable sites ==
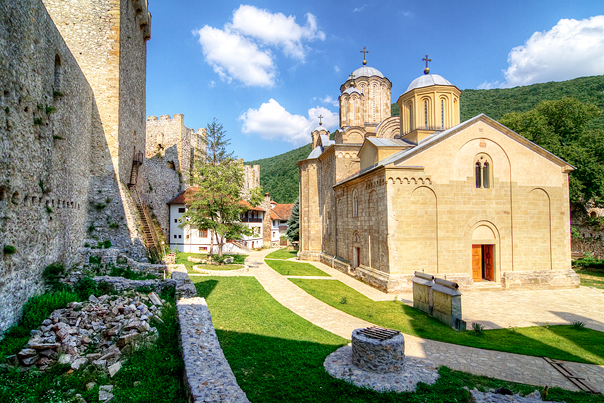
Manasija

- Manasija monastery
- Resava Cave (Serbian: Resavska Pećina)
- Veliki buk waterfall in Lisine, in upper Resava valley.

== See also ==
- List of places in Serbia
