= Homolje =

Geographic region in the country of Serbia

Coordinates: 44.233639°N 21.747093°E

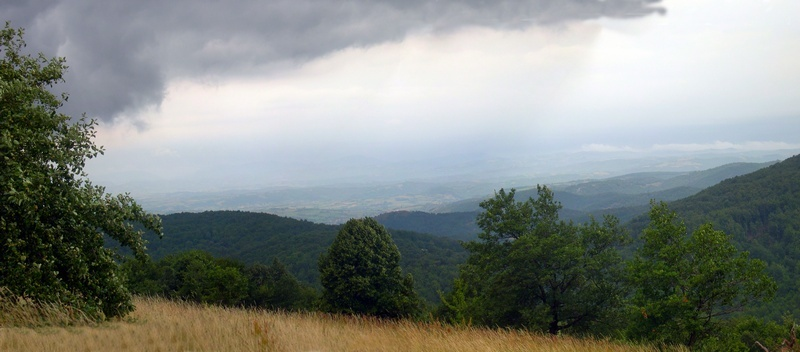
Homolje to the north

Homolje (Serbian Cyrillic: Хомоље, pronounced [xɔ̌mɔʎɛ]; Romanian: Homolie) is a small geographical region in east Serbia south of the Danube river. It is centered on the town of Žagubica, with smaller parts belonging to municipalities of Kučevo, Majdanpek and Petrovac. In the narrow sense, the term "Homolje" is applied only to the Homolje valley around Mlava river, but it is usually applied to the low Homolje mountains (940 m) north of the valley and Beljanica and Crni Vrh mountains at the south. It is sparsely populated, and renowned for its unspoiled nature.

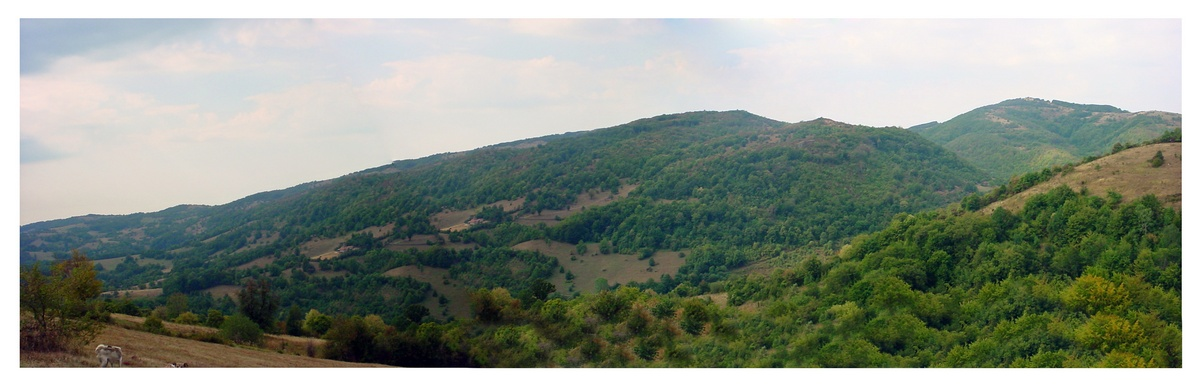
Homolje plains

The main river is the Mlava which receives nine tributaries from the right and six from the left. But there are numerous other karst springs, sinking rivers and rapids. There are four gorges in the area (Gornjak, Ribare, Osanica and Tisnica) and numerous, unexplored caves (Pogana Cave, Ledena Cave, Strogine Caves). The region is covered with thick forests and many sinkholes and pits.

Homolje is also known for its vivid folklore which includes abundant legends of vampires, dragons, fairies and bats.

The region of Homolje is sparsely populated, with ethnic Vlachs making a majority of residents in some areas thereof, and because of the small population its nature is unspoilt. One of its attractions is a vast forest called Trest.

== Population ==
Populated places in Homolje (2002 Census):

| Place | Area (km²) | Population | Pop. density |
|---|---|---|---|
| Žagubica | 189.84 | 3,197 | 17 |
| Laznica | 74,81 | 2,440 | 33 |
| Krepoljin | 47.80 | 1,958 | 41 |
| Suvi Do | 91.33 | 1,365 | 15 |
| Osanica | 66.52 | 1,281 | 19 |
| Sige | 19.84 | 935 | 47 |
| Milatovac | 22.16 | 913 | 41 |
| Krupaja | 25.52 | 766 | 30 |
| Jošanica | 36.10 | 708 | 20 |
| Milanovac | 16.47 | 595 | 36 |
| Selište | 61.00 | 567 | 9 |
| Ribare | 19.08 | 542 | 28 |
| Vukovac | 22.95 | 519 | 23 |
| Bliznak | 20.41 | 412 | 20 |
| Izvarica | 18.93 | 396 | 21 |
| Breznica | 22.37 | 244 | 11 |
| Medveđica | 4.76 | 46 | 10 |

== Sources ==
- Homolje, Homolje Tourism, archived from the original on 2008-07-24
- Homolje unofficial presentation, online since 2000., Homolje Web developing team, archived from the original on 2010-05-06
