= Kučaj =

Mountain in Serbia

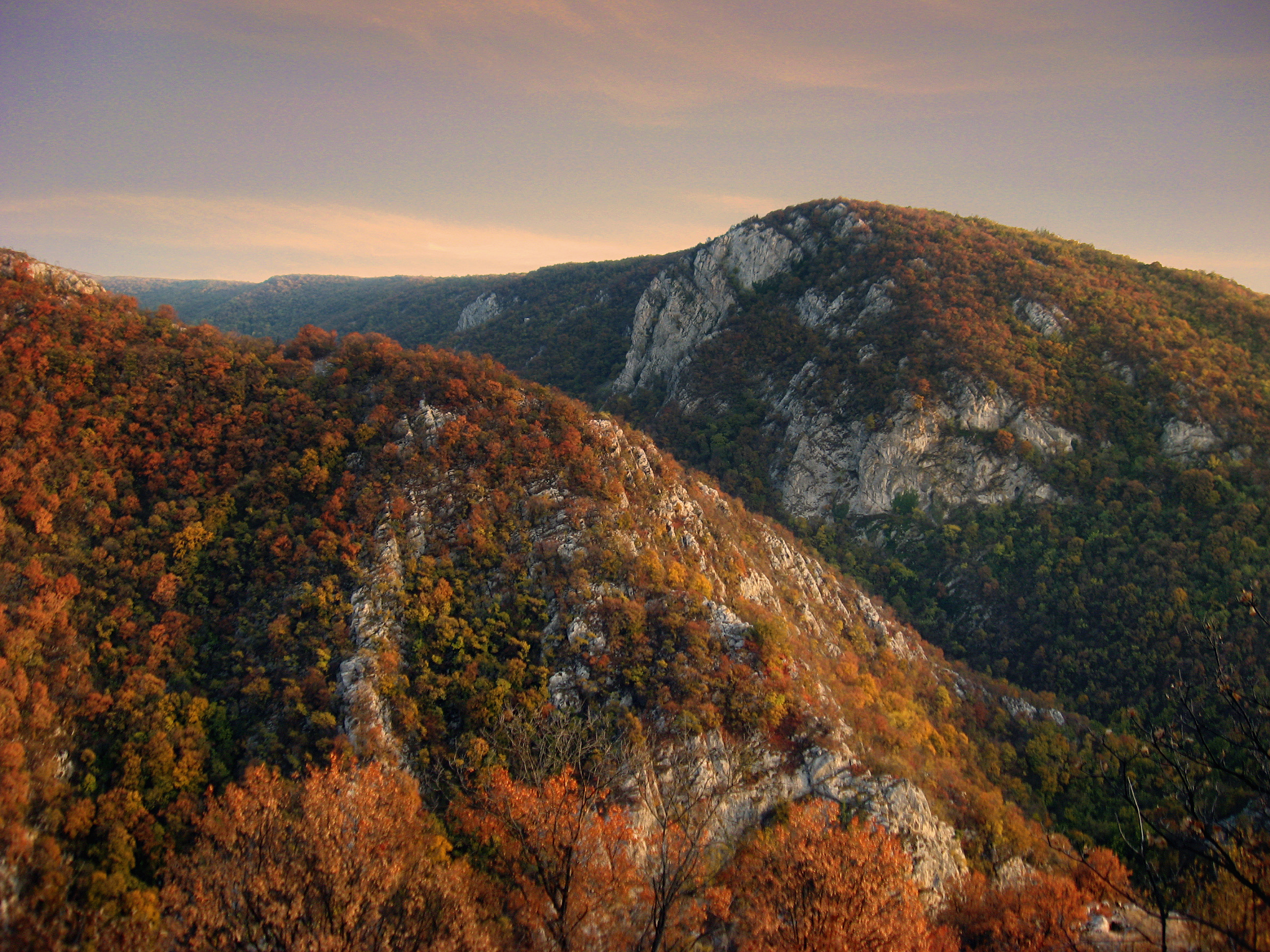

Highest point
- Elevation: 1,284 m (4,213 ft)
- Coordinates: 44°04′48″N 21°49′41″E

Geography
- Location within Serbia
- Location: Eastern Serbia
- Parent range: Carpathian Mountains

Kučaj (Serbian: Кучај, pronounced [kûtʃaj]) is a mountain region in eastern Serbia. Its highest peak, Velika Tresta, has an elevation of 1,284 meters above sea level. They belong to the Serbian extension of Carpathian Mountains, which separate the valleys of Great Morava and Timok.

== Geography ==
The area is a plateau in form, of complex tectonic and morphological structure, subdivided by the river valleys. One of the main features is the Resava Cave. North of Resava Cave is the natural monument Lisine, which comprises two waterfalls, Veliko Vrelo and Veliki Buk. The Lisine hydro-complex and Resava Cave are under one administration. In 2017 the Government of Serbia and Institute for Nature Protection began preliminary actions into creating a new national park, which would cover the mountainous Kučaj-Beljanica region. It is supposed to be the sixth and the largest national parks of Serbia encompassing the Resava Cave, Lisine complex and some of the oldest, intact forest in the country, like the Vinatovača rainforest, which remained intact since the mid 17th century. The study on protection was finished in 2020. It concluded that the area is the most forested one in Serbia, and described it as the proper wilderness.

== Features ==
=== Sinking rivers ===
The karst region is location of numerous sinking rivers:

- Kločanica; with the length of 14.5 km (9.0 mi), it is the longest sinking river in eastern Serbia. It sinks into the abyss at an elevation of 520 m (1,710 ft), flows underground for 1.875 km (1.165 mi) and resurfaces in the Resava valley, at an elevation of 355 m (1,165 ft).
- Klencuš; 13 km (8.1 mi) long, it sinks into the chasm at an elevation of 581 m (1,906 ft) and reappears after an underground flow of 4.7 km (2.9 mi) at an elevation of 284 m (932 ft) as the Zlot springs which form the river of Zlotska.
- Velika Tisnica; it springs at the Beljanica mountain and is 13 km (8.1 mi) long. It disappears at 460 m (1,510 ft), flows 5 km (3.1 mi) below the ground and springs out again at 312 m (1,024 ft) as Žagubica Spring. From there, it flows as the 122 km (76 mi) long Mlava river.
- Nekudovo; 11 km (6.8 mi) long, sinks at 625 m (2,051 ft) and after 8.5 km (5.3 mi) springs out at 380 m (1,250 ft) as the source of the Crnica river.
- Demizlok; it is 10.6 km (6.6 mi) long and goes underground at 645 m (2,116 ft) in the sinking cave. It resurfaces after 284 m (932 ft) at 6 km (3.7 mi) in another cave, Lazareva Pećina, which is the longest explored cave in Serbia.
- Mikulj; 9.5 km (5.9 mi) long stream sinks at 677 m (2,221 ft) and after 5.125 km (3.185 mi) springs out at the Zlot springs.

=== Veliki Buk Waterfall ===
Veliki Buk (or Lisine) waterfall is located in the watershed of the Resava in eastern Serbia. It is carved in the karst area, where the sinking river of Resava springs again from the ground in the canyon-type valley of Sklop. The waters springs from the karst spring Veliko Vrelo, forming a short stream of the same name which falls into the Resava. With the height of 25 m (82 ft), it was considered the highest waterfall in Serbia until the 1990s when the higher waterfalls were discovered on the Kopaonik and in the Visok region of the Stara Planina. The waterfall is situated at an elevation of 450 m (1,480 ft) and 20 km (12 mi) east of Despotovac. It is formed on the tufa rocks and the water falls into the 5 m (16 ft) deep lake. In August 2017 the waterfall was embellished with the color-changing decorative lights, becoming the first hydrology object in Serbia with such lights. The access roads are arranged with several restaurants but as of 2017 there is no mobile phone signal in the area, which the local tourist guides say is "probably a positive thing". There is also a stream water mill, "Mija's watermill" within the complex. It is built in 1918 and is still operational, though it is adapted into the tourist attraction, equipped with the objects from the century ago.

== See also ==
- List of mountains in Serbia
