= Resava =

Resava (Serbian Cyrillic: Ресава) refers to several toponyms and related topics, all of them located around the river Resava in central Serbia:

- Resava (river), a river
- Resava (region), a region, surrounding the river
  - Upper Resava
  - Lower Resava
- Resava Monastery, a monastery
- Resava school, a cultural movement in 14th-15th century started and funded by Stefan Lazarević
- Resava Coal Mines, (or REMBAS) coal mines in the Resava river valley
- Resava Cave, a cave and popular tourist attraction
