= Svetlana Stević Vukosavljević =

- Born: Svetlana Stević; 15 February 1948 (age 78); Milatovac, SR Serbia, Yugoslavia
- Genres: Traditional music
- Occupation: artist
- Instrument: vocal
- Years active: 1976–present

Svetlana Stevic Vukosavljević (born 15 February 1948 in Milatovac), graduated from the Chemical-technological technical school in Belgrade.

More than 35 years Vukosavljević is engaged in research work in the field of ancestral culture in Homolje – Eastern Serbia. As a gifted singer of the traditional Serbian songs, in 1976, she became a soloist of Radio Belgrade and since then has left a large opus of permanent recordings sound archives of Radio Belgrade. That same year she became a collaborator on several programs on Radio Belgrade, "Svanovnik" (the Dawn), "Od zlata jabuka" (Golden Apple) and "Riznica" (Treasury) in which she still participates.

In 2009, Vukosavljević received a special award which is awarded to the artists for superior contribution to the national culture of the Republic of Serbia.
