= Resava Cave =

Cave in Serbia

- Resavska Cave; Serbian: Ресавска пећина Resavska pećina
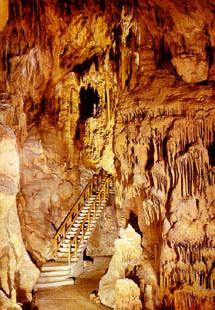
- Interactive map of Resava Cave
- Location: Jelovac, eastern Serbia
- Coordinates: 44.0725°N 21.6297°E
- Depth: 80 m (260 ft)
- Length: 4.5 km (2.8 mi)
- Elevation: 485 m (1,591 ft)
- Discovery: 1962
- Show cave opened: 1972
- Visitors: 56,500 in 2017
- Website: www.resavskapecina.rs

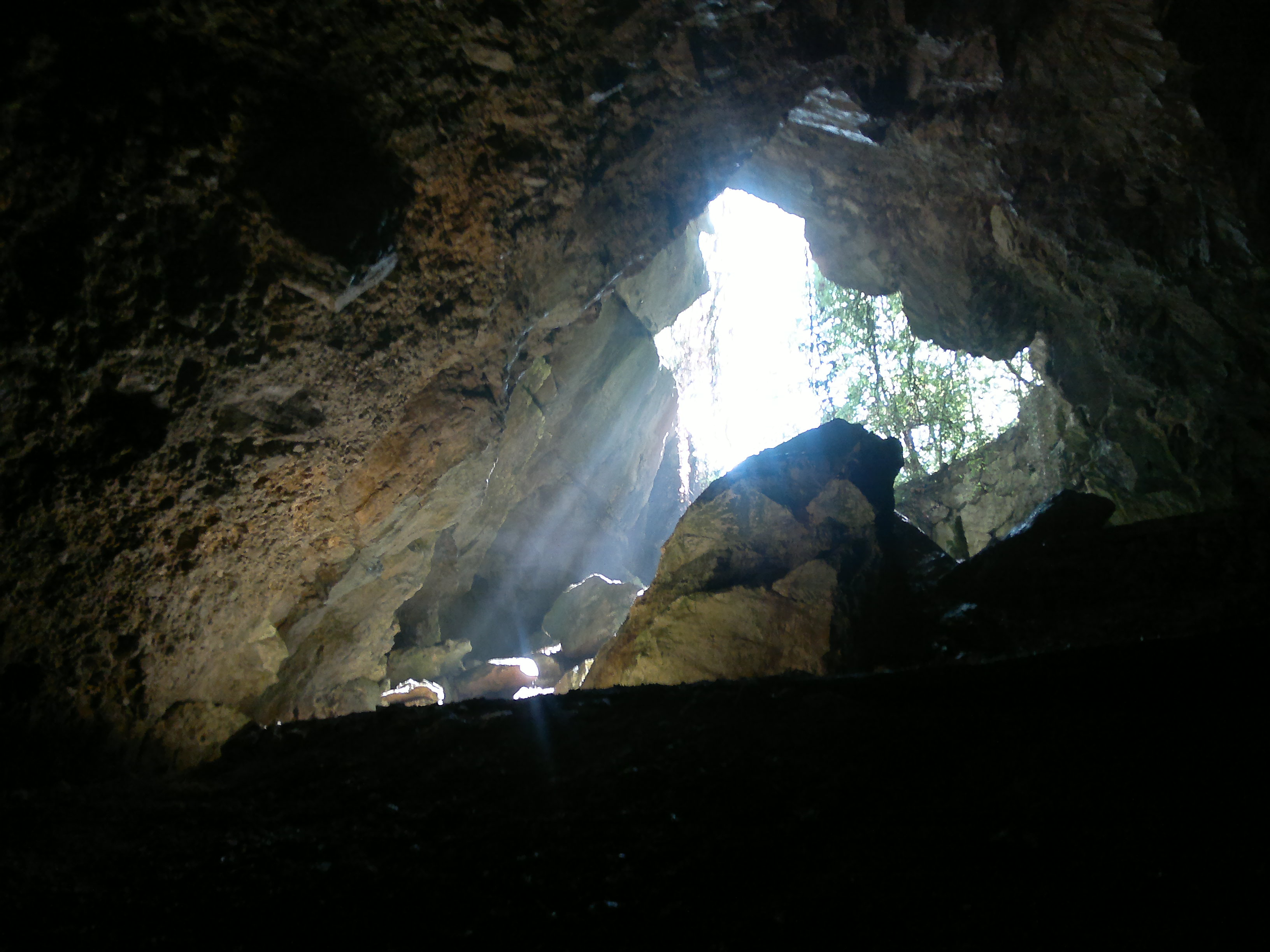
View from Resava Cave

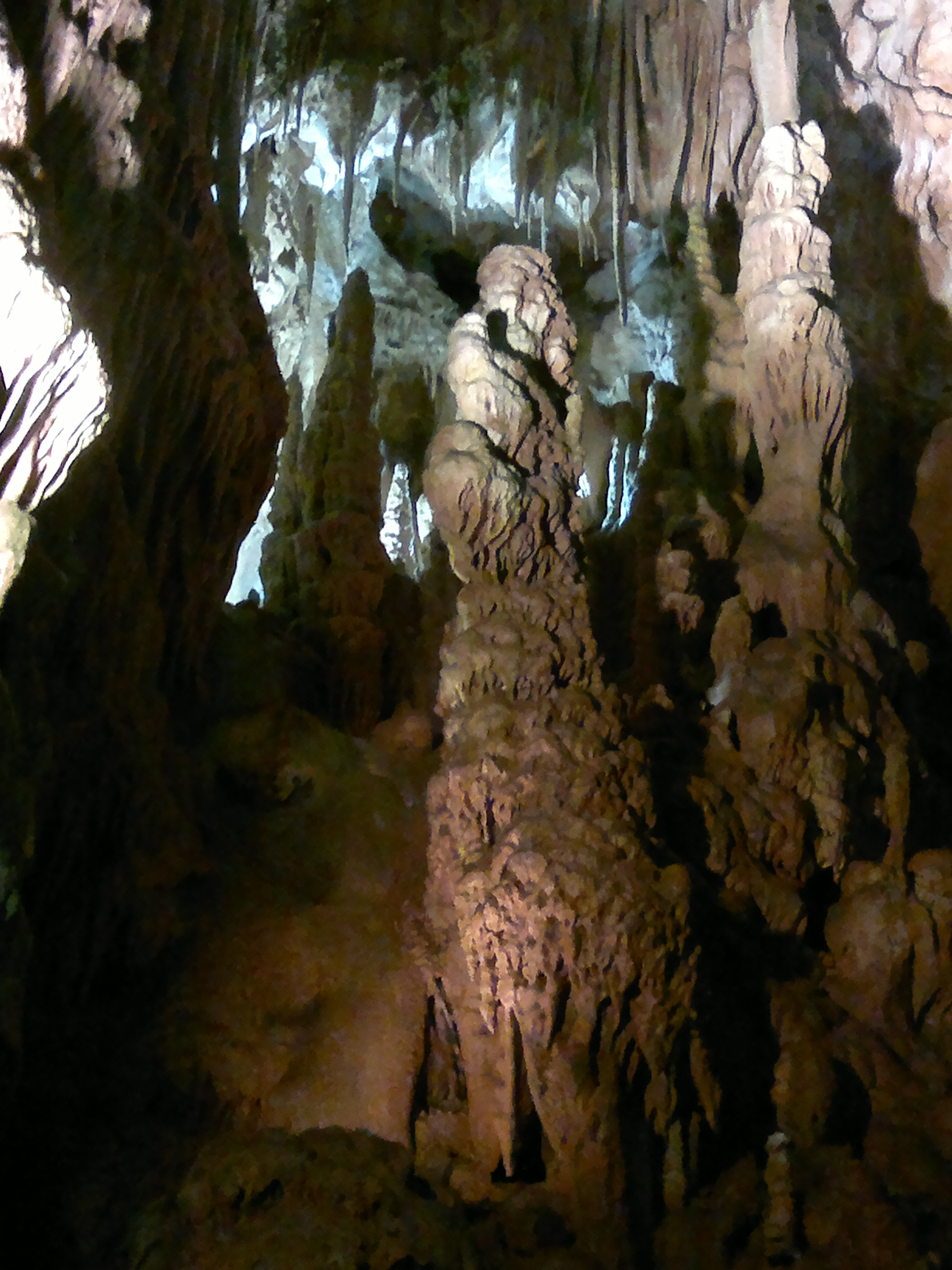
Stalagmite resembling mother with baby, symbol of Resava Cave

Resava Cave (Serbian: Ресавска пећина, romanized: Resavska pećina) or Resavska Cave is a cave near Jelovac in eastern Serbia, about 20 kilometres (12 miles) from Despotovac. It is one of the largest cave systems in Serbia, with the corridors about 4.5 kilometres (2.8 miles) long.

== Geography ==
The cave is located in the Upper Resava region. The cave is estimated to be 80 million years old while the oldest speleothems date from 45 million years ago. It has four halls on two levels each and the speleothems are colored in red, yellow and white. Altitude at the entrance into the cave is 485 metres (1,591 feet) and the lowest point inside is at 405 metres (1,329 feet).

The cave was formed by the sinking river in the limestone substrate. Cave formations are right at the entry. They are formed through the dissolving of the calcium carbonate. The color depends on the mineral through which the water flows: red from the iron oxide, white from the crystallized calcium and yellow from the traces of clay. The symbol of the cave is a massive stalagmite, 20 m (66 ft) tall and 12 m (39 ft) wide. After its appearance, it was named the Statue of mother with a child. The cave consists of 8 halls.

== Wildlife ==
In 2020, the survey which began in the mid-1990s, showed that the large cave, and some smaller surrounding caves in the Resava valley, host 28 species of bats. Researchers from the University of Belgrade's Biology Faculty calculated that even the smallest bats can eat up to 3,000 mosquitos per night, which may explain the apparent lack of mosquitos in the Resava valley and on the slopes of the Beljanica mountain.

== Human history ==
Resava cave was accidentally discovered by the local shepherds in 1962. After being explored for 10 years, the cave was officially opened for visitors on 22 April 1972. On 1 May 2017, the Adrenalin Park, a new attraction was opened in the cave. It consist of 15 obstacles (hanging bridges, hanging cables, zip-line, beams, etc.). It had 56.500 visitors in 2017.

Out of its 4.5 kilometres (2.8 miles), 2.83 kilometres (1.76 miles) is explored in detail, while 0.8 kilometres (0.50 miles) is adapted for the visitors. A popular tourist story developed around a specific stalactite and a stalagmite, their "love yearning and a kiss". They are just few millimeters apart, but it will take a 1,000 years before they reach each other. Since 2010, Resava Cave is member of ISCA, International Show Caves Association. In 2017 it became the first hydrological monument with the decorative lights in Serbia. LED, cold lights are used, so that it wouldn't affect the microclimate. Glowing info tables in each of the halls and new hand rails were also added.

North of Resava Cave is the cultural monument Lisine, which comprises two waterfalls, Veliko Vrelo and Veliki Buk. The Lisine hydro-complex and Resava Cave are under one administration, covering an area of 11 ha (27 acres). In 2017 the Government of Serbia and Institute for Nature Protection began preliminary actions into creating a new national park, which would cover the mountainous Kučaj-Beljanica region. It is supposed to be the largest national park in Serbia, which would, among other, encompass the Resava Cave, Lisine complex and some of the oldest, intact forest in the country, like the Vinatovača rainforest, which remained intact since the mid 17th century.

== See also ==
- List of caves in Serbia
