= Resava (river) =

Resava (Ресава)
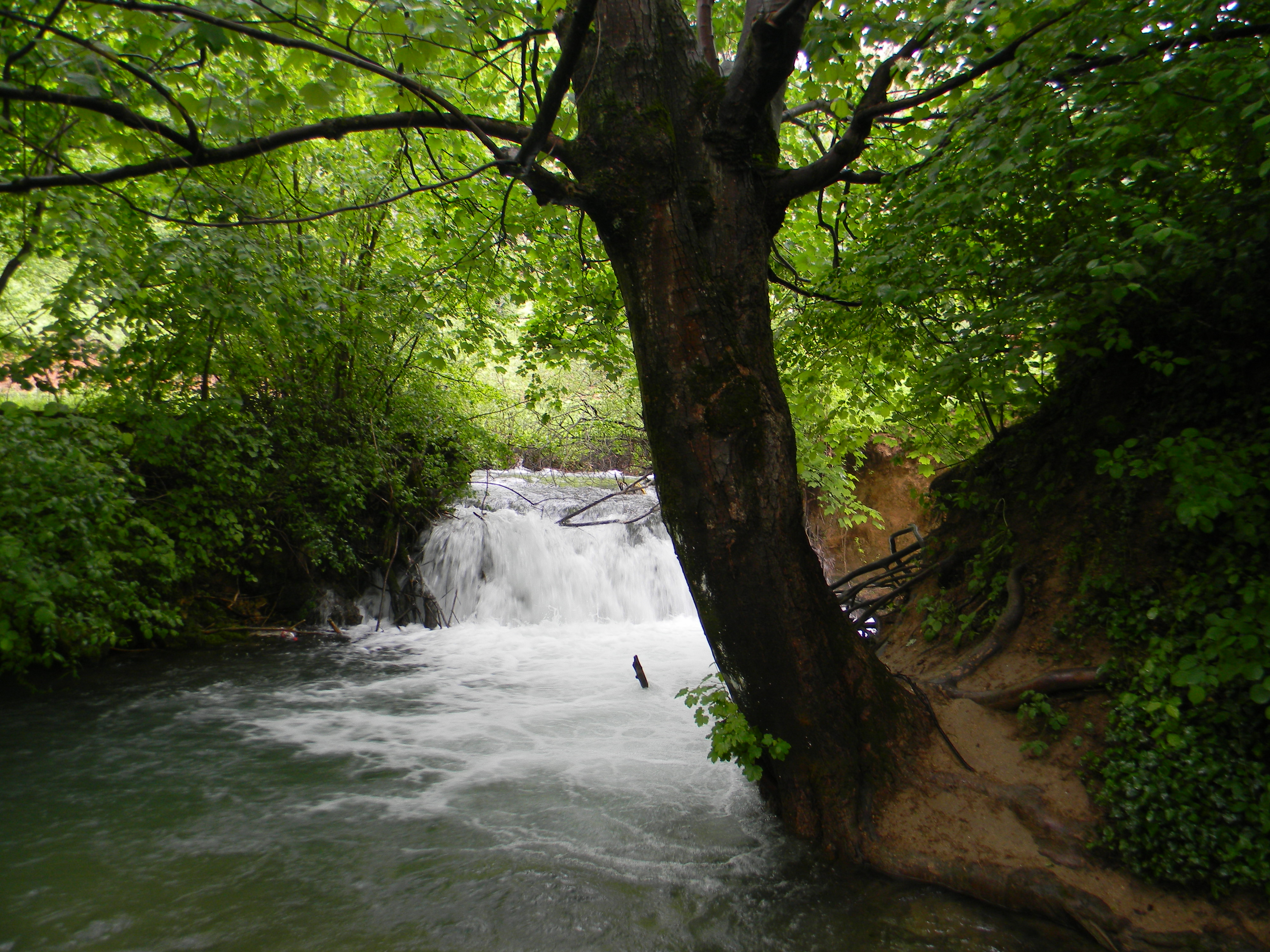
- Resava source

Location
- Country: Serbia

Physical characteristics
- Source
  - location: Beljanica mountain, central Serbia
  - elevation: 1,100 m (3,600 ft)
- Mouth
  - location: Velika Morava, west of Svilajnac, central Serbia
  - coordinates: 44.2461°N 21.1731°E
- Length: 65 km (40 mi)
- Basin size: 744 km^{2} (287 sq mi)

Basin features
- Progression: Great Morava→ Danube→ Black Sea

The Resava (Serbian Cyrillic: Ресава) is a river in central Serbia, a 65 km-long right tributary to the Velika Morava. It also gives the name to the surrounding Resava region, the Resava Monastery, the coal mines in its valley and the popular tourist destination of Resava Cave.

== River ==
The Resava originates from the Homolje region in eastern Serbia. It springs out at an altitude of 1,100 m and flows westward between the mountains of Beljanica (on the north) and Kučaj (on the south). In its upper course, the Resava runs parallel to its left tributary, the Kločanica, and area around the villages of Strmosten, Vodna and Stenjevac is known for many caves (Resava Cave, Sokolica, Crystal, etc.).

The Resava carved a 25 km-long and 400 m-deep gorge, with a central part of it representing a typical canyon valley, the Sklop. In the gorge, the river becomes a sinking river for a while and creates a 25 m-high waterfall, until recently, the highest one in central Serbia.

In its lower course, the river creates a typical epigene gallery feature, between the hills of Pastorak (570 m) and Maćeha (Serbian for stepson and stepmother). The river enters the Resava region and receives its major tributary, the Resavica from the left near the Dvorište village. It passes next to the Manasija monastery, small town and regional center of Despotovac, and turns northwest, into the lower Resava region and western border of Veliko Pomoravlje.

The Resava passes through the REMBAS coal mining region, next to the villages of Miliva, Plažane, Medveđa, Subotica, Sedlare, Lukovica and the regional center of lower Resava, the town of Svilajnac, and soon after it empties into the Velika Morava.

The Resava belongs to the Black Sea drainage basin, drains an area of 744 km^{2} and it is not navigable.

== Region ==
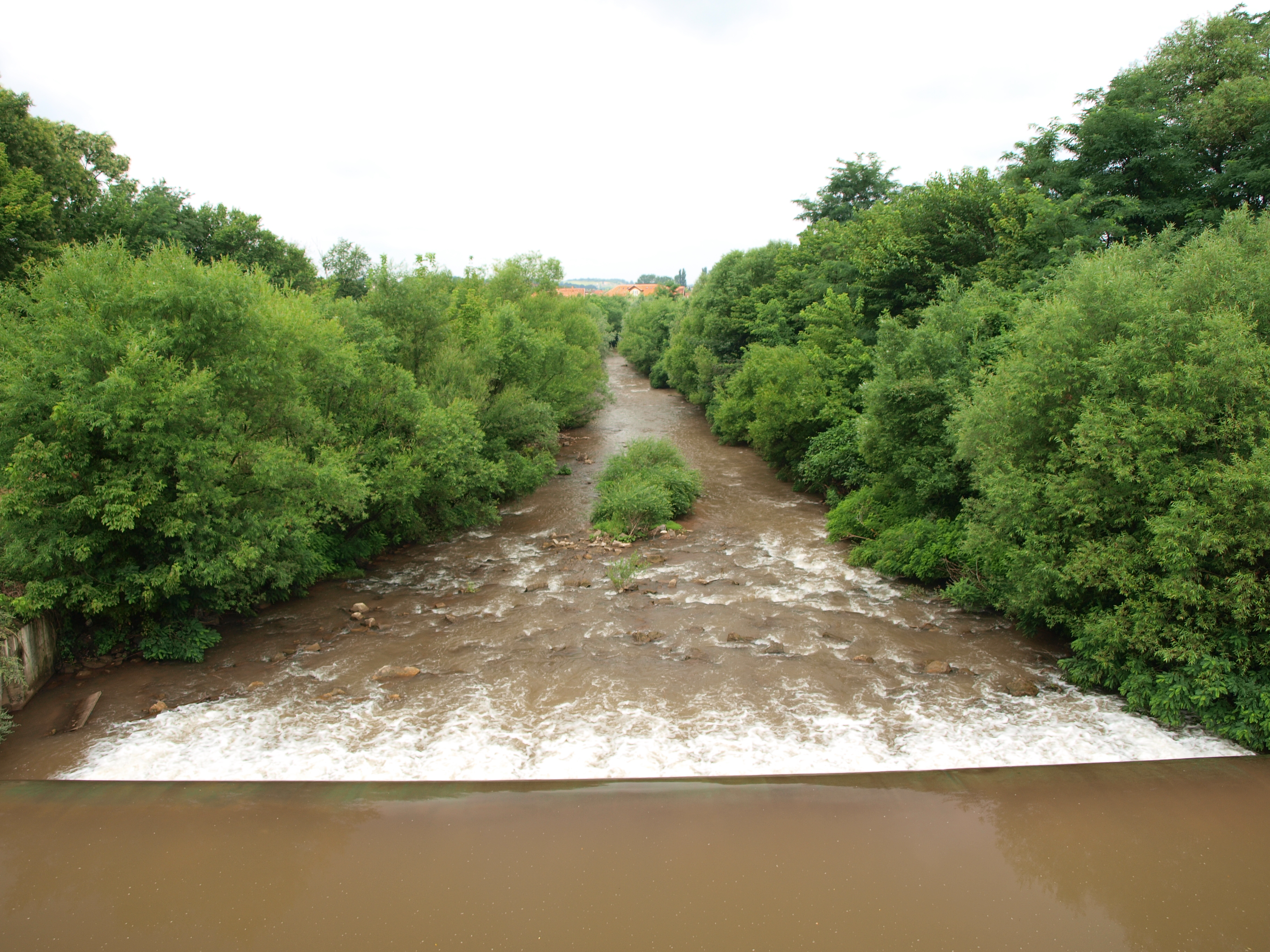
Resava at Despotovac.

The Resava region divides in two: Upper Resava (eastern) and Lower Resava (western).

Eastern Resava is located around the southern and western slopes of the Beljanica mountain. The area is partially karst, made of limestone, and as a result of a porous terrain, many caves are formed.

Western Resava represents the extension of the peripannonic area of the southern Pannonian Plain. It comprises the Resava Coal Mines, with a small towns of Resavica, Despotovac and Svilajnac. Apart from the mining, the area is mostly agricultural.

In the beginning of the 19th century, Resava was knežina, one of the Ottoman occupied Serbia's duchies with limited self-rule. Resava was ruled 1803-09 by the vojvoda Stevan Sinđelić, one of the greatest heroes of the First Serbian Uprising.

== Resava Coal Mines ==
Resava-Morava Coal Mines (Resavsko-moravski ugljeni basen/Ресавско-моравски угљени басен) or shortly REMBAS (РЕМБАС) are located in the lower Resava river valley. They comprise the brown coal mines of Resava, Ravna Reka, Vodna and Senjski Rudnik in the Resava watershed and the Jasenovac in the watershed of the Mlava river. The basin is sometimes also referred to as the Senj-Resava Coal Mines (Senjsko-resavski ugljeni basen/Сењско-ресавски угљени басен).
