= Homolje Mountains =

Mountain in Serbia

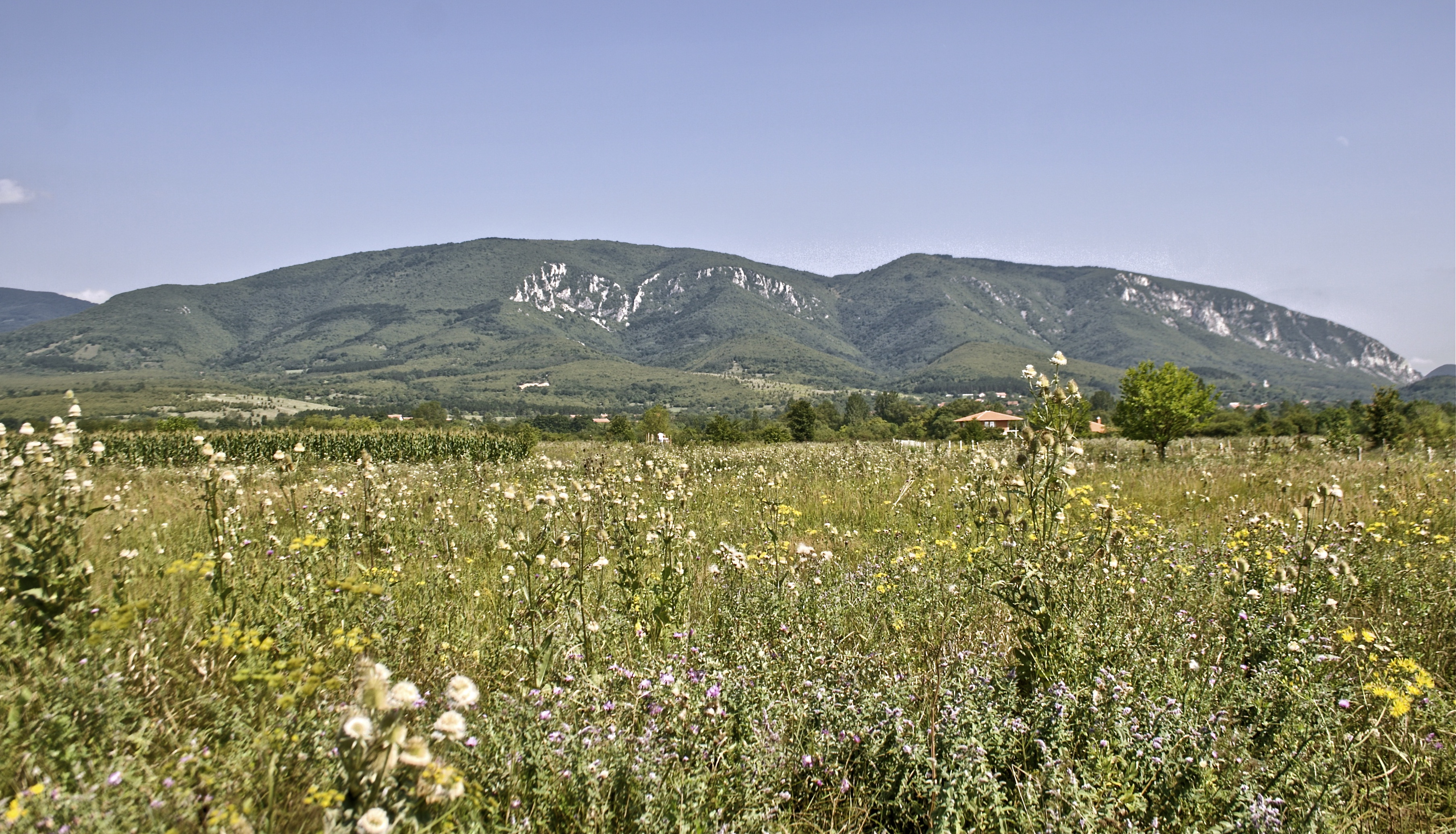

Highest point
- Elevation: 940 m (3,080 ft)
- Coordinates: 44°21′31″N 21°37′45″E

Geography
- Location within Serbia
- Location: Eastern Serbia
- Parent range: Carpathian Mountains

The Homolje Mountains (Serbian: Хомољске планине / Homoljske planine; Romanian: Munții Homolie or Munții Homoliei) is a mountain in eastern Serbia, in the region of Homolje, located between towns of Žagubica in the south and Kučevo in the north.

Their highest peaks are Štubej (940 m) and Vranj (884 m). Hidden in the mountains is the Orthodox monastery of Vitovnica.

The region of Homolje is sparsely populated, with ethnic Vlachs making a majority of residents in some areas thereof, and because of the small population its nature is unspoilt. One of its attractions is a vast forest called Trest.

== See also ==
- List of mountains in Serbia
