= Vinatovača =

Old beech forest in the central-east Serbia

Coordinates: 44.064985°N 21.766722°E

Vinatovača (Serbian Cyrillic: Винатовача) is an old beech forest in the central-east Serbia. It is the only rainforest in Serbia, left undisturbed for several centuries. It is located in the municipality of Despotovac and is placed under the state protection as the strict natural reserve, which covers an area of 0.37 km^{2} (0.14 sq mi).

Vinatovača is situated in the central Kučaj mountains in the Upper Resava region, at an altitude between 640 m (2,100 ft) and 800 m (2,600 ft). It is isolated and hard to reach which helped its preservation. It is believed that trees have not been cut in Vinatovača since c. 1650. Being under strict protection means not only that the trees that die of old age are not being cleared or removed, but even picking herbs or mushrooms is forbidden. It is considered as an example of what central and eastern Serbia's natural look is. Beech trees are up to 45 m (148 ft) tall and some specimens are estimated to be over 350 years old.

The forest was one of the research locations in the "SERBHIWE" project of the University of Belgrade's Institute for Biological Research "Siniša Stanković". The scope of the project was to document habitats of wild honeybees in Serbia, in order to protect their natural environment and their gene pool in order to preserve a dwindling population of domestic bees. Vinatovača proved to be a perfect habitat for the wild honeybees, which inhabit numerous hollow trunks. Several other localities rich in bees were documented, but Vinatovača was the largest.

The rain forest is labeled as an "Eldorado" for biologists and geneticists, while International Union of Forest Research Organizations declared Vinatovača a "representative reserve" and a "European rarity".
