= Sige =

- Village
- Location within Serbia
- Coordinates: 44°13′06″N 21°35′43″E
- Country: Serbia
- District: Braničevo District
- Municipality: Žagubica

Population (2002)
  - Total: 704
- Time zone: UTC+1 (CET)
  - Summer (DST): UTC+2 (CEST)

Sige is a village in the municipality of Žagubica, Serbia. According to the 2002 census, the village has a population of 704 people.

== Jasenovac Mine ==
Jasenovac mine
- Interactive map of Jasenovac mine
- Products: Coal
- Company: PEU Resavica
- Website: jppeu.rs/rmu-jasenovac/

On the territory of Sige, and on a road from Krepoljin village, there is an active coal mine RMU Jasenovac, operated by the PEU Resavica mining company.
