= Suvi Do (Žagubica) =

Suvi Do Суви До
- Village
- Location within Serbia
- Coordinates: 44°12′N 21°44′E
- Country: Serbia
- District: Braničevo District
- Municipality: Žagubica

Population (2002)
  - Total: 1,320
- Time zone: UTC+1 (CET)
  - Summer (DST): UTC+2 (CEST)

Suvi Do is a village in the municipality of Žagubica, Serbia. According to the 2002 census, the village has a population of 1320 people.
