= Vukovac =

- Village
- Location within Serbia
- Coordinates: 44°15′33″N 21°44′19″E
- Country: Serbia
- District: Braničevo District
- Municipality: Žagubica

Population (2002)
  - Total: 492
- Time zone: UTC+1 (CET)
  - Summer (DST): UTC+2 (CEST)

Vukovac is a village in the municipality of Žagubica, Serbia. According to the 2002 census, the village has a population of 492 people.
