= Milatovac (Žagubica) =

Milatovac Милатовац
- Village
- Location within Serbia
- Coordinates: 44°15′39″N 21°45′59″E
- Country: Serbia
- District: Braničevo District
- Municipality: Žagubica

Population (2002)
  - Total: 828
- Time zone: UTC+1 (CET)
  - Summer (DST): UTC+2 (CEST)

Milatovac is a village in the municipality of Žagubica, Serbia. According to the 2002 census, the village has a population of 828 people.
