= Milanovac, Žagubica =

Milanovac
- Village
- Location within Serbia
- Country: Serbia
- District: Braničevo District
- Municipality: Žagubica

Population (2002)
  - Total: 445
- Time zone: UTC+1 (CET)
  - Summer (DST): UTC+2 (CEST)

Milanovac is a village in the municipality of Žagubica, Serbia. According to the 2002 census, the village had a population of 445 people.
