= Žagubica =

Žagubica Жагубица (Serbian) Jagubița or Jăgobița (Romanian)
- Village and municipality
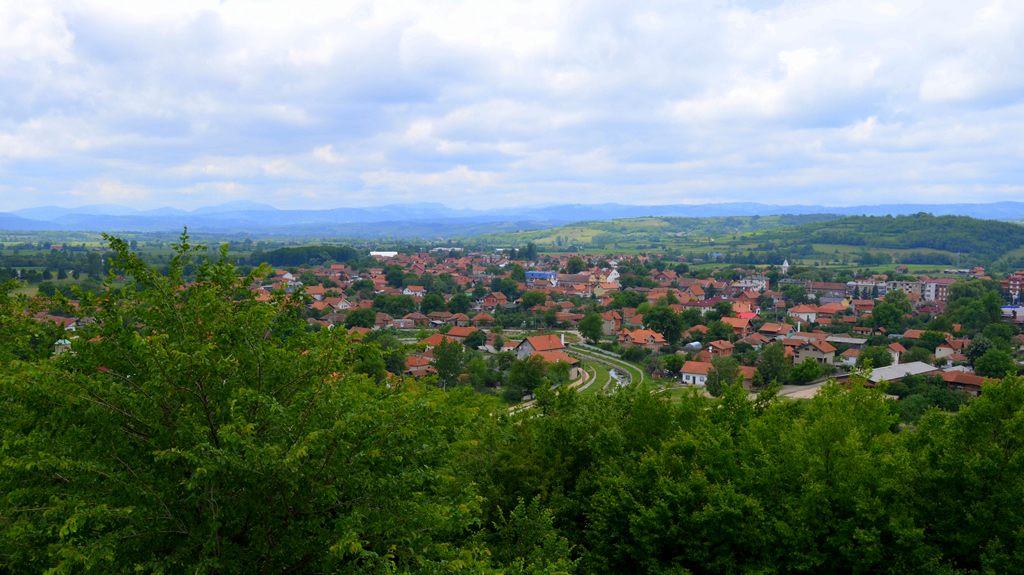

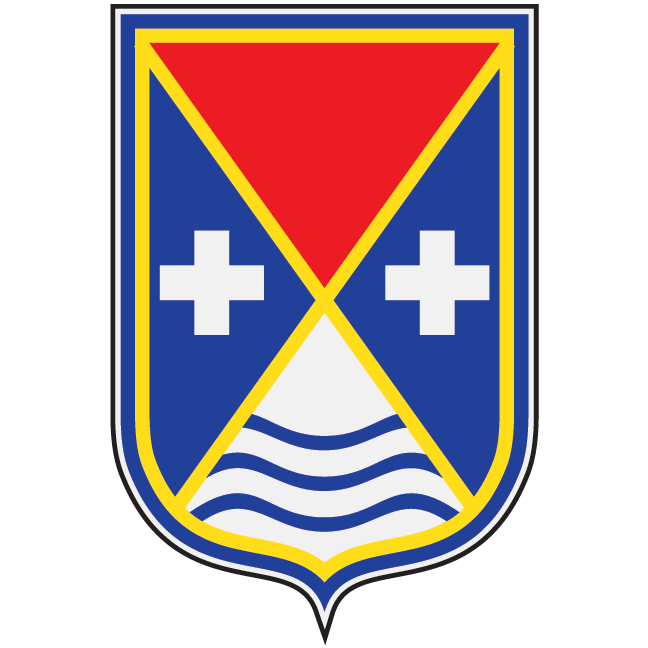
- Flag Coat of arms

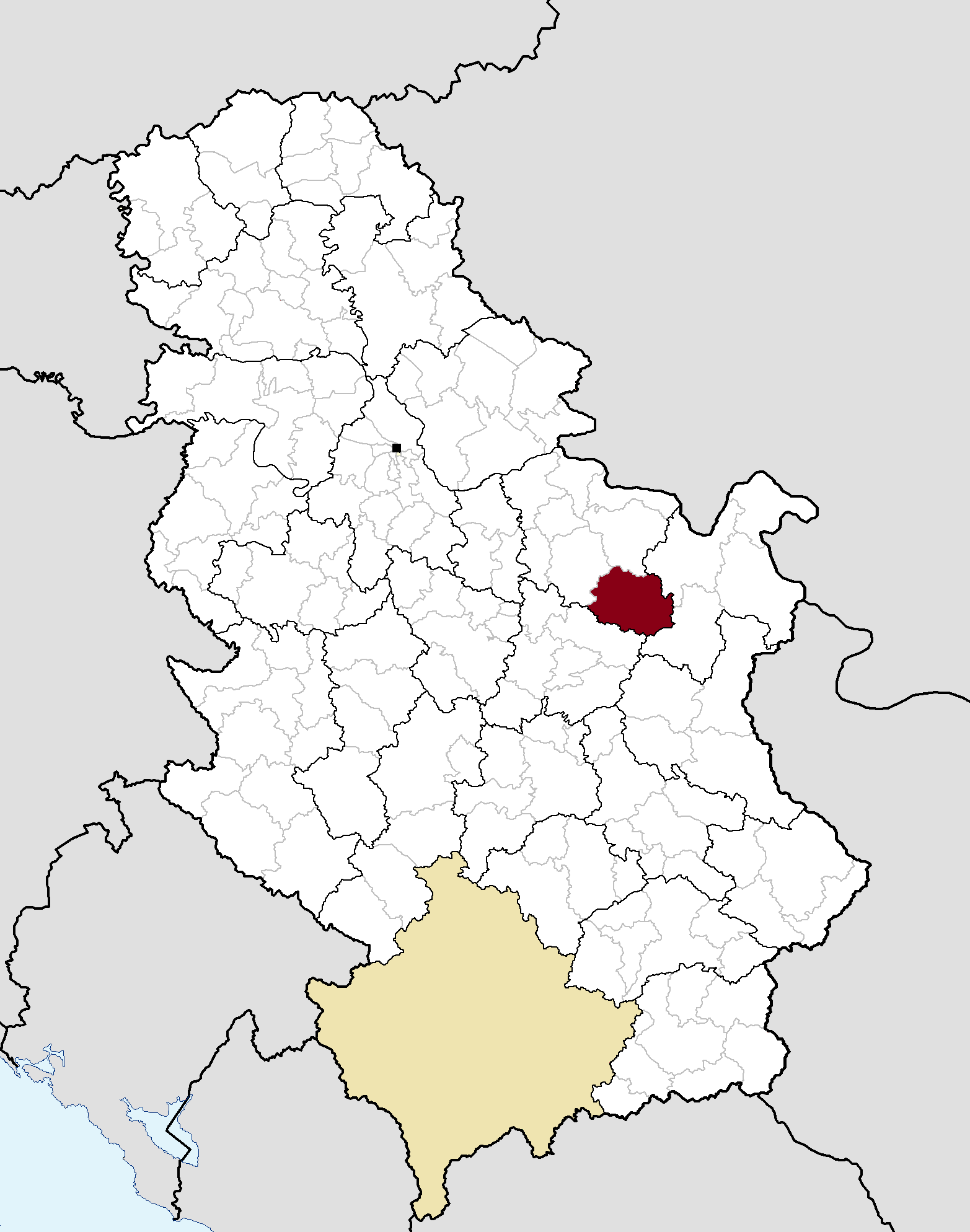
- Location of the municipality of Žagubica within Serbia
- Coordinates: 44°12′N 21°48′E
- Country: Serbia
- Region: Southern and Eastern Serbia
- District: Braničevo
- Settlements: 18

Government
  - Mayor: Safet Pavlović (SNS)

Area
  - Municipality: 760 km^{2} (290 sq mi)
- Elevation: 314 m (1,030 ft)

Population (2022 census)
  - Town: 2,110
  - Municipality: 9,712
- Time zone: UTC+1 (CET)
  - Summer (DST): UTC+2 (CEST)
- Postal code: 12320
- Area code: +381(0)12
- Car plates: PO
- Website: www.zagubica.org.rs

Žagubica (Serbian Cyrillic: Жагубица, pronounced [ʒǎɡubitsa]; Romanian: Jagubița or Jăgobița) is a village and municipality located in the Braničevo District of the eastern Serbia. It is situated in the geographical region of Homolje. The population of the village is 2,110 while population of the municipality is 9,712(2022).

== Name ==
In Serbian, the village is known as Žagubica or Жагубица, and in Romanian as Jagubița, Jăgobița or Iaguba.

== Geography ==
The municipality of Žagubica is located between municipalities of Kučevo and Majdanpek in the north, municipality of Bor in the east, municipality of Despotovac in the south, and municipality of Petrovac in the west.

== History ==
By 1836, the craft shops were numerous. That year, there were 23 cloth tailors (abadžija) in Žagubica and its vicinity, 20 blacksmiths, and a number of furriers (ćurčija), tinsmiths, coppersmiths, gunsmiths, coopers. As the trade developed with so many craftsmen, in the 1840s first proper shops were open. At that time, Žagubica developed from a village into the small town (varošica), with a čaršija. The Crafts-Trade Guild was established in the settlement, having 15 trade and 11 craft members in 1900. By 1905 the number doubled, so the guild was split in two, one for trade, other for crafts.

However, the prosperity of the town wasn't followed by the prosperity of the surrounding villages. There, money was spent only on the merchandise that couldn't be made by the villagers themselves. They produced their own clothes, wooden household items and furniture, tools, agricultural utensils, etc. Rural population was at odds with the town's one, as reported by the 1883 communique of the Homolje District Administration: "peasantry in the district is opposing the shops because of the bad influence on the youth's moral which steals food from their houses so that they would acquire cheap, unnecessary merchandise from the shop owners."

After the state issued a prohibition on the "raw" opanak, a craft production of opanak, a common footwear at the time, blossomed. Part of the state strategy to develop the production is prohibition on selling opanak in the shops, only craftsmen were allowed to sell it. Žagubica was one of the rare towns in Serbia which neglected this prohibition, so the production of the footwear never lift off, despite constant protests from the craftsmen against the shops. A product that the area was known were the cradles called ljagan, which were made to be worn on the back. They were ellipsoid, elongated and made of wood, with ornaments either made of glued thin wood panels or painted paper.

In 1836 there were 10 kafanas in the Homolje region, out of which 3 were in Žagubica. They were center of the social life and place where trade deals were made. By 1928, number of kafanas grew from 3 to 15.

From 1929 to 1941, Žagubica was part of the Morava Banovina of the Kingdom of Yugoslavia.

== Religion ==
One of the oldest and most valuable monuments of the Orthodox culture in this area is the Trška Monastery. Originating from the 13th century, it is the oldest surviving sacral object in the Braničevo District.

In the Gornjak Gorge of the Mlava river valley, Gornjak Monastery was built from 1378 to 1381, as an endowment of Prince Lazar. After the Battle of Kosovo in 1389, Lazar's widow Princess Milica and their two underage sons, Stefan and Vuk, spent some time in the monastery. There is a unique representation of Jesus Christ in the monastery, who is painted as a human shepherd with another human across his shoulder, instead of a lamb. Next to the monastery is the "Gate of Homolje", at the entrance into the gorge. It is unusual stone edifice, built into the rock and walled with ramparts, overlooking the monastery.

The Church of Holy Trinity is in the center of the settlement. It was built in the late 19th century. It is considered a symbol of Žagubica and the wider Homolje region.

== Settlements ==
Aside from the village of Žagubica, the municipality includes the following settlements, all rural:

- Bliznak
- Bresnica
- Vukovac
- Izvarica
- Jošanica
- Krepoljin
- Krupaja
- Laznica
- Medveđica
- Milanovac
- Milatovac
- Osanica
- Ribare
- Sige
- Selište
- Suvi Do
- Lipe

== Demographics ==
According to the 2022 census results, the municipality has 9,855 inhabitants.

=== Ethnic groups ===
The ethnic groups in the Žagubica municipality include (2011 census):

- Serbs = 9,024
- Vlachs = 2,811
- Others = 902

Historical population
Year	Pop.	±% p.a.
1948	22,015	—
1953	23,012	+0.89%
1961	22,602	−0.22%
1971	21,055	−0.71%
1981	20,275	−0.38%
1991	17,777	−1.31%
2002	14,823	−1.64%
2011	12,737	−1.67%
2022	9,712	−2.43%

== Economy ==
The following table gives a preview of the total number of employed people per their core activity (as of 2017):

Activity	Total
Agriculture, forestry and fishing	102
Mining	252
Processing industry	161
Distribution of power, gas and water	21
Distribution of water and water waste management	42
Construction	67
Wholesale and retail, repair	191
Traffic, storage and communication	51
Hotels and restaurants	80
Media and telecommunications	12
Finance and insurance	6
Property stock and charter	-
Professional, scientific, innovative and technical activities	47
Administrative and other services	11
Administration and social assurance	155
Education	177
Healthcare and social work	108
Art, leisure and recreation	13
Other services	71
Total	1,566

== Tourism ==
There are numerous festivals in the surrounding area throughout the year. The include the traditional honey trade fair, the cheese and proja festival in Medveđica, Privega and Poklada in Laznica, but also some newer ones, like the Homolje saxophone festival.

== See also ==
- List of places in Serbia
