= Beljanica =

Mountain in Serbia

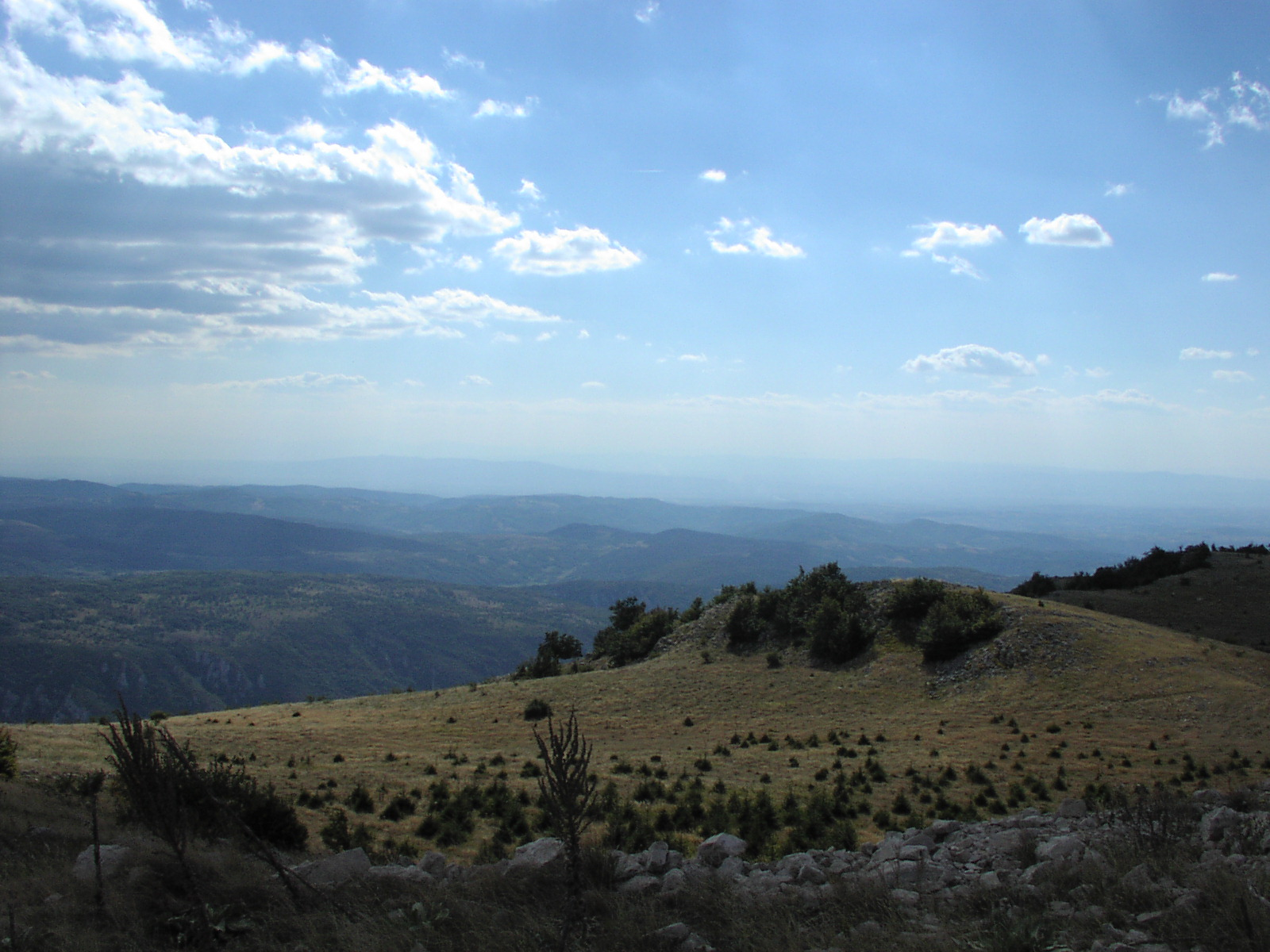

Highest point
- Elevation: 1,339 m (4,393 ft)
- Prominence: 756 m (2,480 ft)
- Coordinates: 44°06′41″N 21°41′59″E

Geography
- Location within Serbia
- Location: Eastern Serbia
- Parent range: Carpathian Mountains

Beljanica (Serbian Cyrillic: Бељаница, pronounced [bɛ̂ːsnaː kɔ̌bila]) is a mountain in eastern Serbia, near the town of Žagubica. Its highest peak has an elevation of 1,339 meters above sea level.

== See also ==
- List of mountains in Serbia
