= List of secondary schools in Romania =

This article lists secondary schools in Romania.

== Alba County ==
- Horea, Cloșca and Crișan National College, Alba Iulia
- Dionisie Pop Marțian Economic College, Alba Iulia
- Apulum Technical College, Alba Iulia
- Alexandru Domșa Technical High School, Alba Iulia
- Saint Simion Ștefan Orthodox Theological Seminary, Alba Iulia
- Bethlen National College, Aiud
- Titu Maiorescu National College, Aiud
- Avram Iancu Technical College, Aiud
- Alexandru Borza Agricultural Technological High School, Aiud
- Dr. Lazăr Chirilă High School, Baia de Arieș
- Inochentie Micu Clain National College, Blaj
- Ștefan Manciulea Technological High School, Blaj
- Sfântul Vasile cel Mare Greek-Catholic Theological High School, Blaj
- Avram Iancu National College (Câmpeni)
- David Prodan Theoretical High School, Cugir
- Ion D. Lăzărescu Technical College, Cugir
- Petru Maior Theoretical High School, Ocna Mureș
- Lucian Blaga National College, Sebeș
- Teiuș Theoretical High School
- Corneliu Medrea High School, Zlatna

== Arad County ==
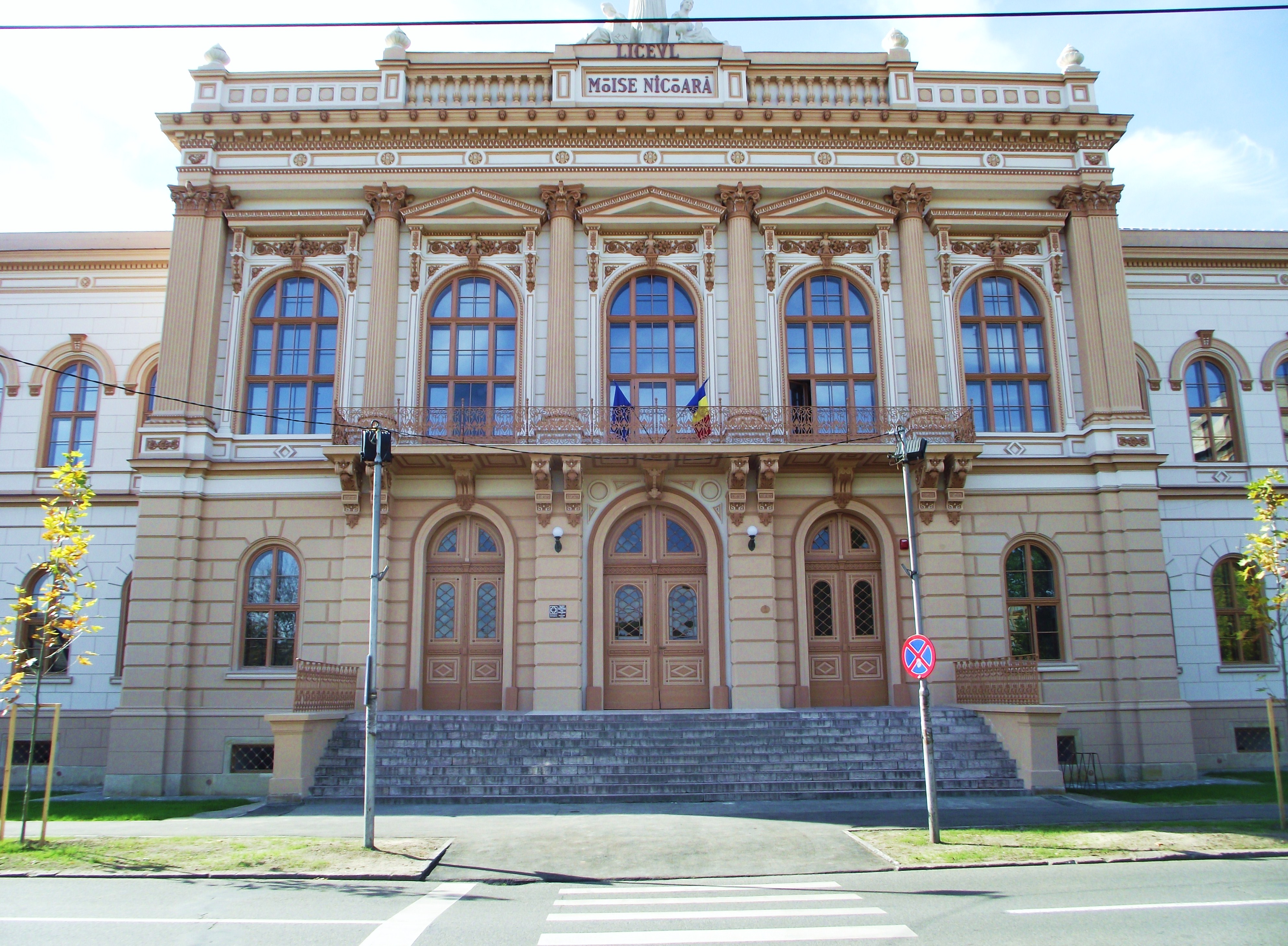
Moise Nicoară National College, Arad

- Moise Nicoară National College, Arad
- Elena Ghiba Birta National College, Arad
- Vasile Goldiș National College, Arad
- Economic College of Arad
- Dimitrie Țichindeal Pedagogical High School, Arad
- Adam Müller-Guttenbrunn High School, Arad
- Arad Technical High School for Constructions and Environmental Protection
- Caius Iacob High School of Electronics and Automation Technology, Arad
- Technological College of Food Industry, Arad
- Francisc Neumann Technological High School, Arad
- Iuliu Maniu Technological High School, Arad
- Iuliu Moldovan Technological High School, Arad
- Henri Coandă Auto Transport Technological High School, Arad
- Spiru Haret UCECOM High School, Arad
- Beliu Technological High School
- Cermei Theoretical High School
- Ion Creangă Technological High School, Curtici
- Ion Buteanu High School, Gurahonț
- Moga Voievod Technological High School, Hălmagiu
- Mihai Viteazul High School, Ineu
- Sava Brancovici Technological High School, Ineu
- Sever Bocu High School, Lipova
- Atanasie Marinescu High School, Lipova
- Vasile Juncu Technological High School, Miniș
- Jozef Gregor Tajovsky High School, Nădlac
- Gheorghe Lazăr Theoretical High School, Pecica
- Sântana Technological High School
- Săvârșin Technological High School
- Vinga Technological High School

== Argeș County ==
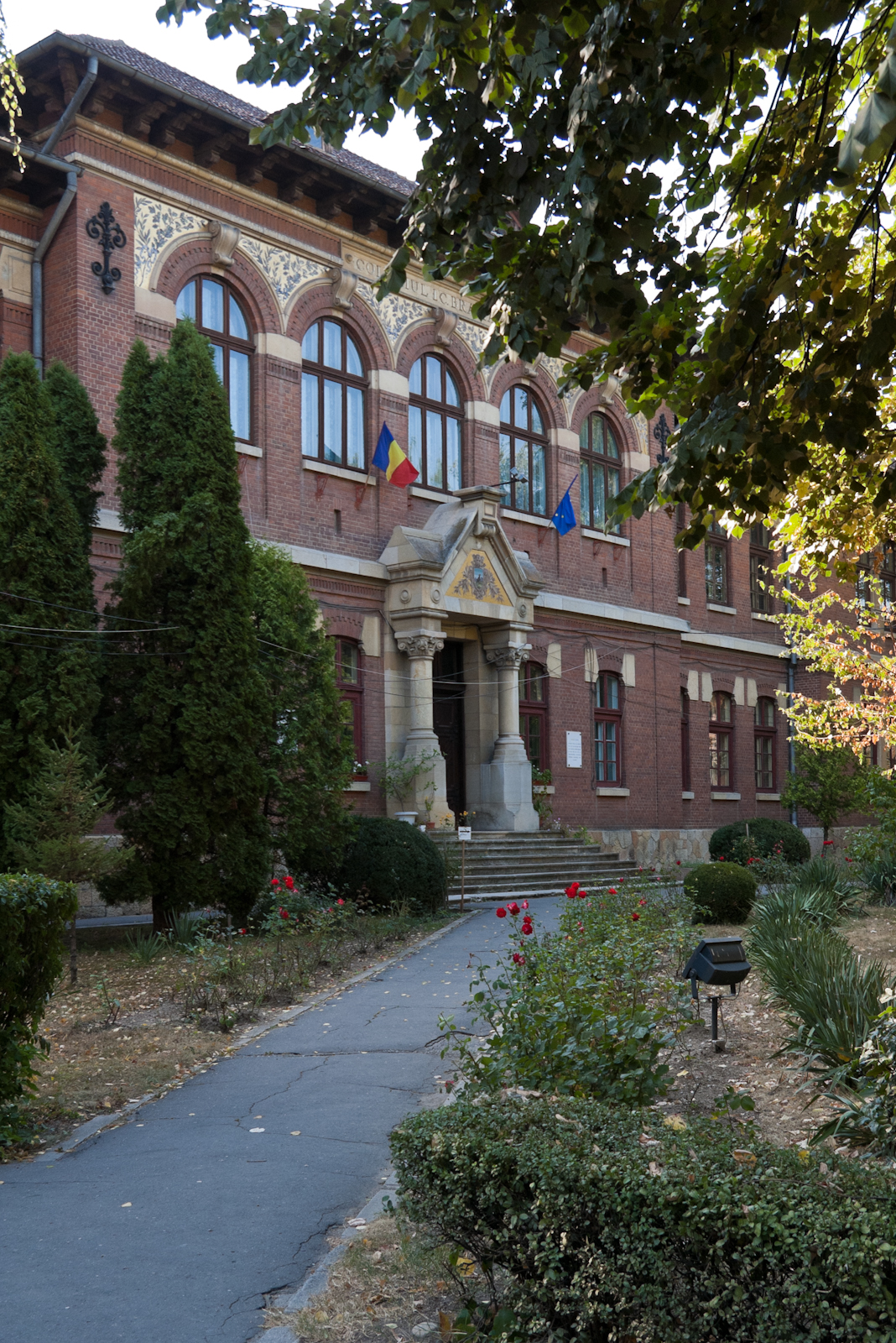
Ion Brătianu National College, Pitești

- Ion Brătianu National College (Pitești)
- Zinca Golescu National College, Pitești
- Alexandru Odobescu National College, Pitești
- Ion Barbu Theoretical High School, Pitești
- Ion Cantacuzino Theoretical High School, Pitești
- Maria Teiuleanu Economic College, Pitești
- Armand Călinescu Technical High School, Pitești
- Costin D. Nenițescu Technical High School, Pitești
- Astra Technologic High School, Pitești
- Dacia Technologic High School, Pitești
- Constantin Brâncuși Technologic High School, Pitești
- Dimitrie Dima Technologic High School, Pitești
- Dinicu Golescu National College, Câmpulung
- Carol I National Pedagogical College, Câmpulung
- Dan Barbilian Theoretical High School, Câmpulung
- Câmpulung Technical College
- Costești Technologic High School
- Vlaicu Vodă National College, Curtea de Argeș
- Ferdinand I Technologic High School, Curtea de Argeș
- King Michael I Technologic High School, Curtea de Argeș
- Constantin Dobrescu Technologic High School, Curtea de Argeș
- Iulia Zamfirescu Theoretical High School, Mioveni
- Victor Slăvescu Technologic High School, Rucăr
- Dinu Brătianu Technologic High School, Ștefănești
- Ion Mihalache Theoretical High School, Topoloveni
- Topoloveni Technologic High School
- Vedea Technologic High School

== Bacău County ==
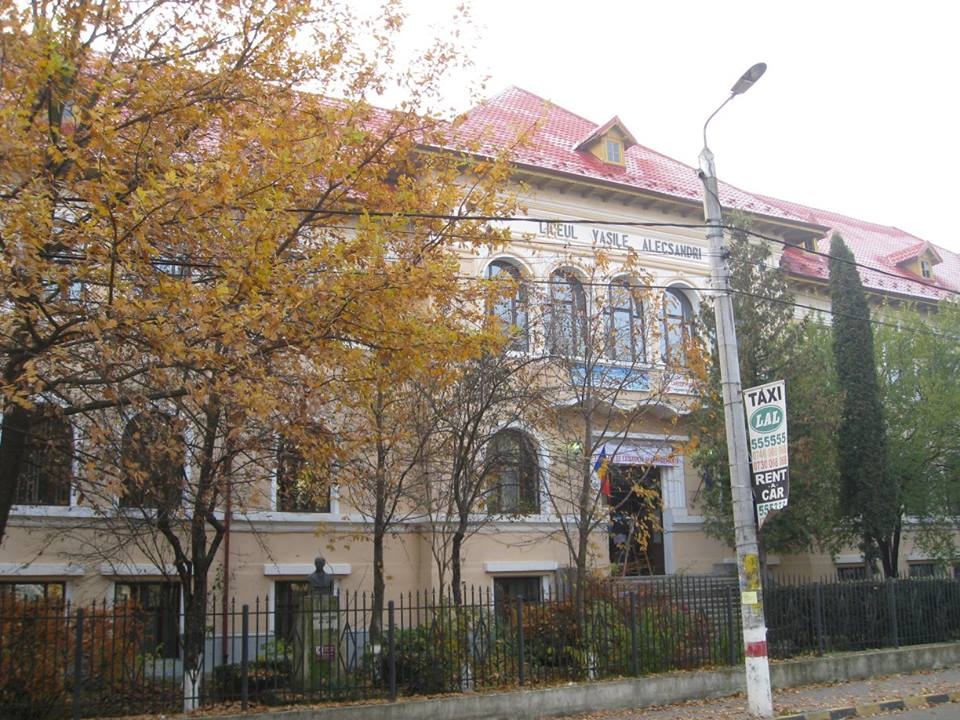
Vasile Alecsandri National College

- Ferdinand I National College, Bacău
- Vasile Alecsandri National College (Bacău)
- Saint Joseph National Catholic College, Bacău
- Mihai Eminescu College, Bacău
- Ion Ghica Economic College, Bacău
- Stephen the Great National Pedagogical College, Bacău
- Nicolae Vasilescu-Karpen Technical College of Communications, Bacău
- George Apostu National College of Art, Bacău
- Henri Coandă Theoretical High School, Bacău
- Anghel Saligny Technological High School (Bacău)
- Grigore Antipa Technological High School, Bacău
- Ion Borcea Technical College, Buhuși
- Dimitrie Ghika Technical College, Comănești
- Dărmănești Technological High School
- Spiru Haret Theoretical High School, Moinești
- Grigore Cobălcescu Technical College, Moinești
- Dimitrie Cantemir National College, Onești
- Grigore Moisil National College (Onești)
- Gheorghe Asachi Technical College, Onești
- Petru Poni Technological High School, Onești
- Nadia Comăneci Sports High School, Onești
- Fericitul Ieremia Theological High School, Onești
- Alexandru Vlahuță Technological High School, Podul Turcului
- Costache Negri National College, Târgu Ocna
- Jacques M. Elias Technological High School, Sascut

== Bihor County ==
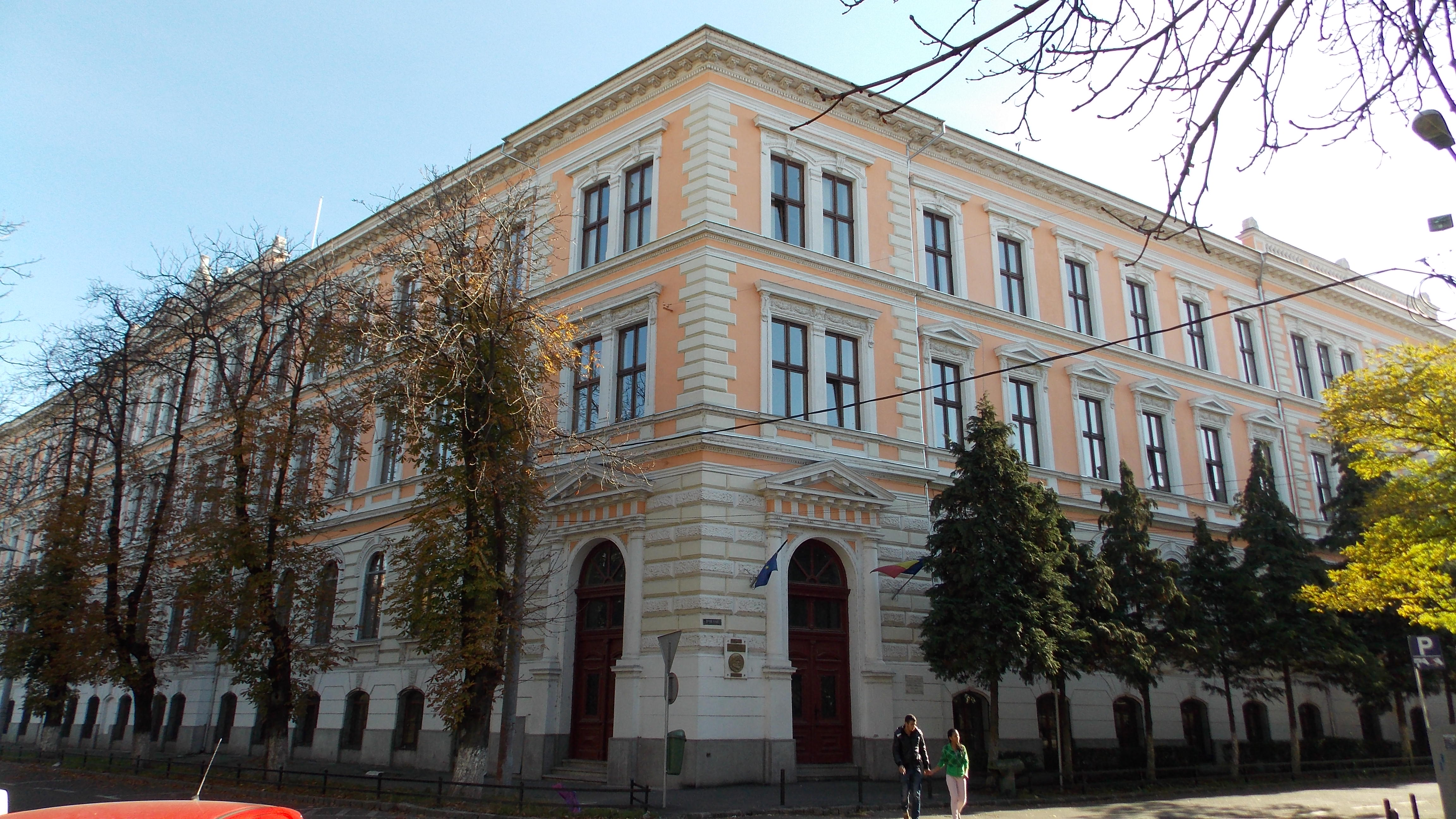
Emanuil Gojdu National College, Oradea

- Emanuil Gojdu National College, Oradea
- Mihai Eminescu National College (Oradea)
- Endre Ady Theoretical High School, Oradea
- Traian Vuia Technical College, Oradea
- Samuil Vulcan National College, Beiuș
- Gabriel Țepelea Theoretical High School, Borod
- Octavian Goga National College, Marghita
- Horváth János Theoretical High School, Marghita
- Horea Technological High School, Marghita
- Teodor Neș National College, Salonta
- Avram Iancu National College (Ștei)

== Bistrița-Năsăud County ==
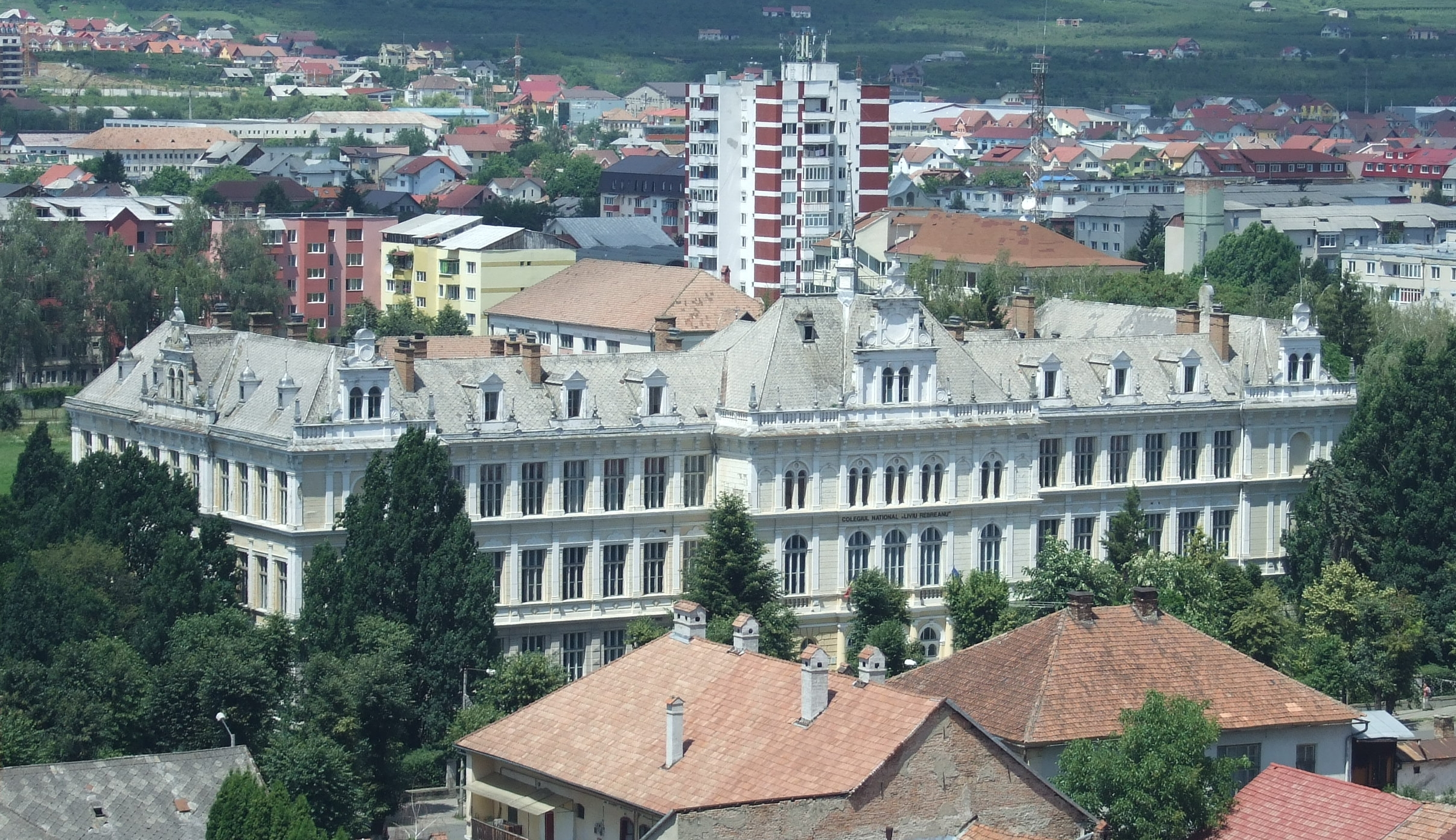
Liviu Rebreanu National College, Bistrița

- Liviu Rebreanu National College, Bistrița
- Andrei Mureșanu National College (Bistrița)
- Corneliu Baba High School of Arts, Bistrița
- High School of Music, Bistrița
- Petru Rareș National College (Beclean)
- Henri Coandă Technological High School (Beclean)
- Beclean Agricultural Technological High School
- George Coșbuc National College (Năsăud)
- Solomon Halita Theoretical High School, Sângeorz-Băi
- Constantin Romanu-Vivu Theoretical High School, Teaca

== Botoșani County ==
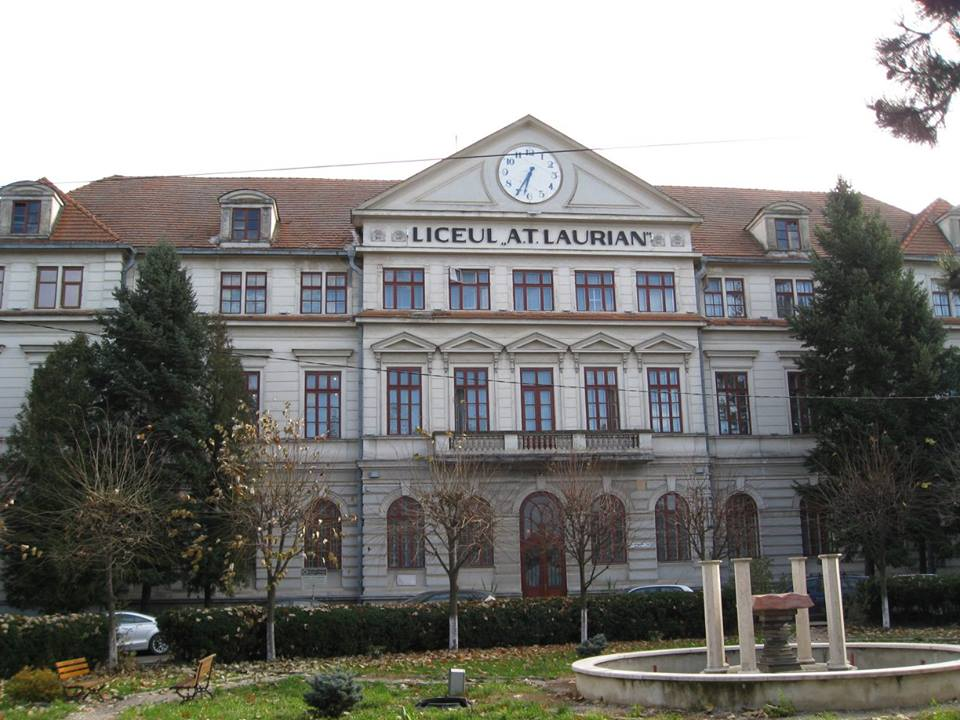
A. T. Laurian National College, Botoșani

- A. T. Laurian National College, Botoșani
- Mihai Eminescu National College (Botoșani)
- Anastasie Bașotă Theoretical High School, Botoșani
- Grigore Antipa Theoretical High School, Botoșani
- Alexandru cel Bun High School, Botoșani
- Dimitrie Negreanu High School, Botoșani
- Octav Onicescu Economics College, Botoșani
- Gheorghe Asachi Technical College, Botoșani
- Nicolae Iorga Pedagogical High School, Botoșani
- Petru Rareș Technological High School, Botoșani
- Elie Radu Technological High School, Botoșani
- Dimitrie Cantemir High School (Darabani)
- Grigore Ghica National College, Dorohoi
- Regina Maria High School, Dorohoi
- Mihai Ciucă Theoretical High School, Săveni

== Brașov County ==
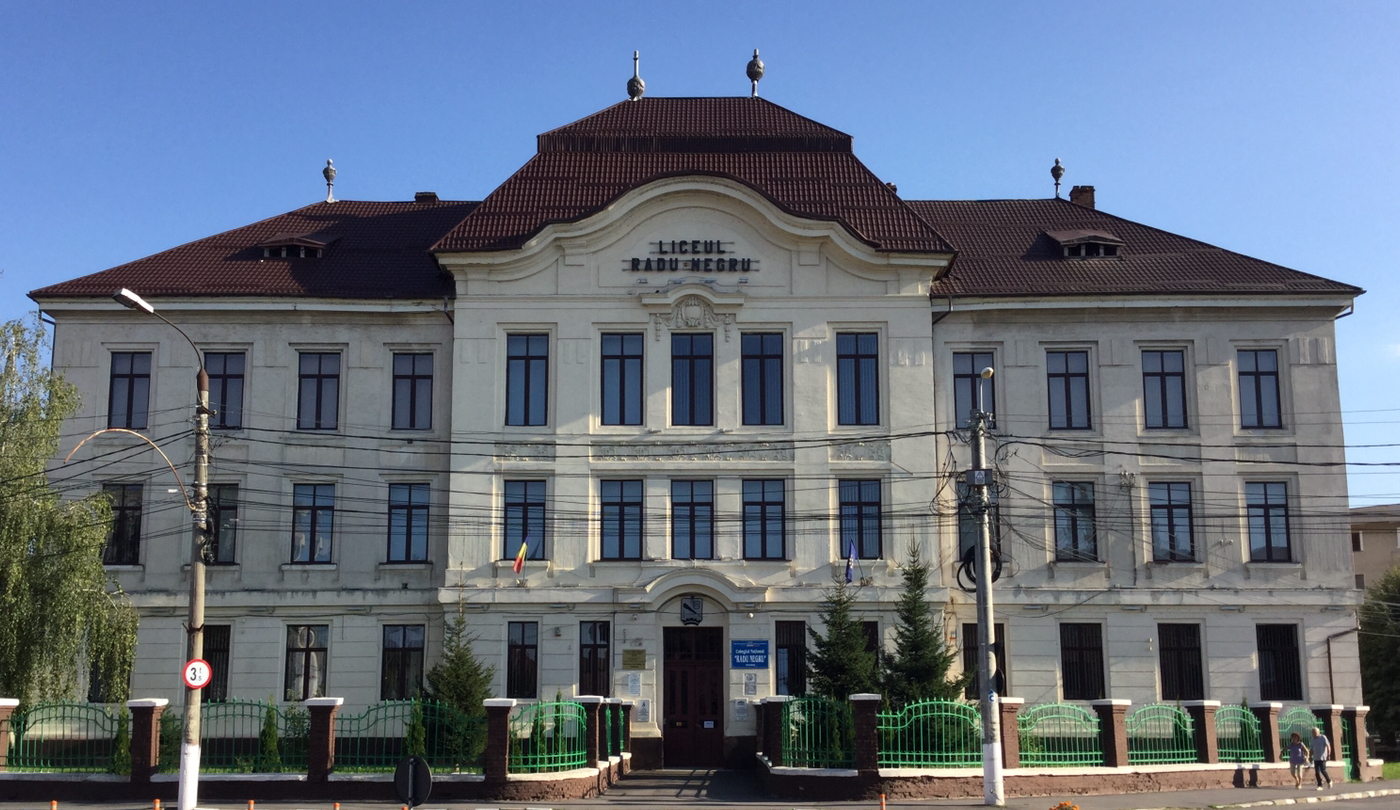
Radu Negru National College, Făgăraș

- Áprily Lajos National College, Brașov
- Ioan Meșotă National College, Brașov
- Grigore Moisil National College of Computer Science (Brașov)
- Unirea National College (Brașov)
- Andrei Bârseanu National Economic College, Brașov
- Emil Racoviță College of Natural Sciences, Brașov
- Grigore Antipa College of Science, Brașov
- Nicolae Titulescu College, Brașov
- Andrei Mureșanu High School, Brașov
- Greater Grace International Academy, Brașov
- Ioan Pascu Theoretical High School, Codlea
- Simion Mehedinți Technical High School, Codlea
- Radu Negru National College, Făgăraș
- Doamna Stanca National College (Făgăraș)
- Ioan Șenchea Technical High School, Făgăraș
- Mihail Săulescu Theoretical High School, Predeal
- Râșnov Technical High School
- Ștefan Octavian Iosif High School, Rupea
- George Moroianu Theoretical High School, Săcele
- István Zajzoni Rab Theoretical High School, Săcele
- Ion Codru-Drăgușanu Theoretical High School, Victoria

== Brăila County ==
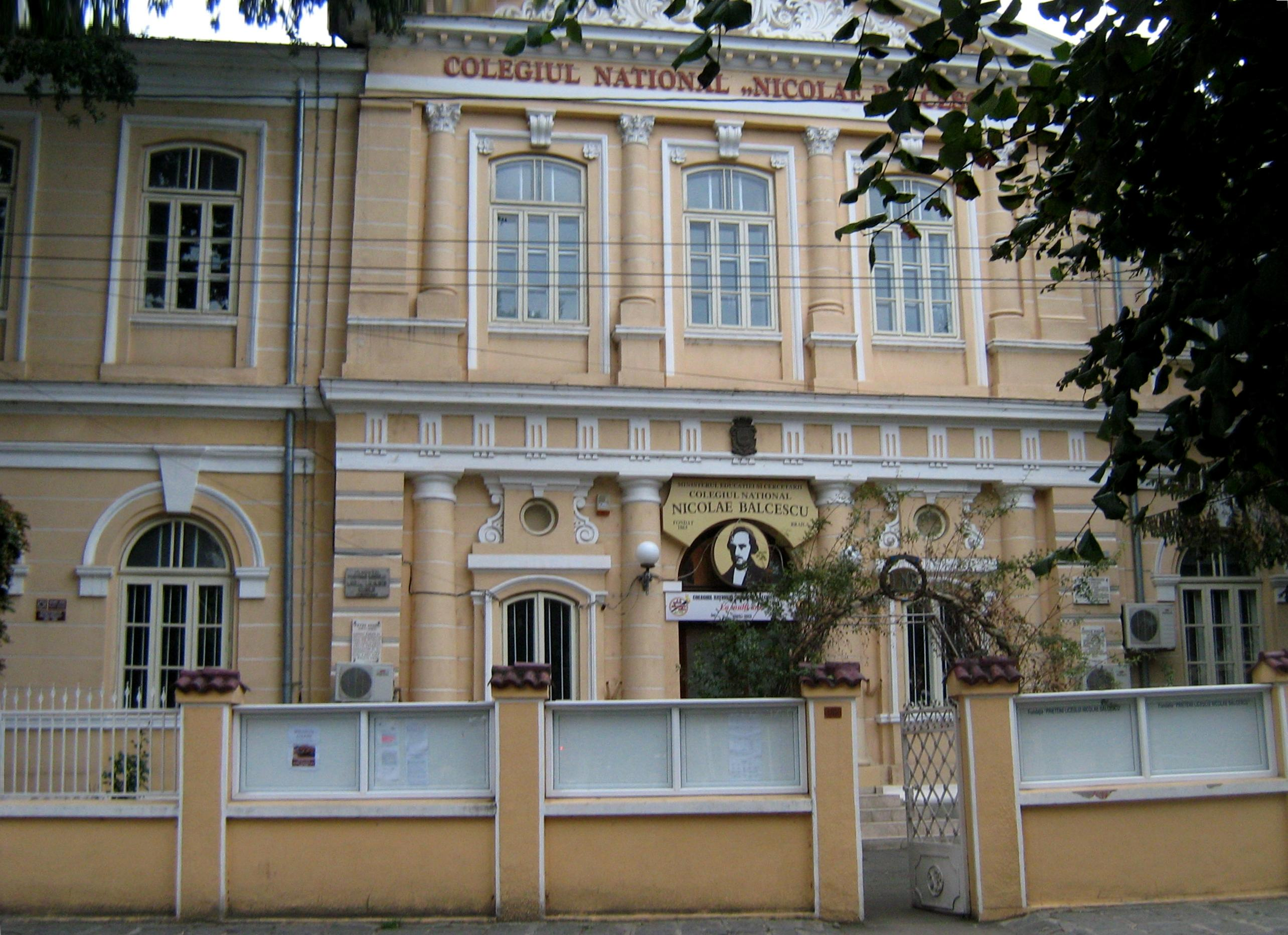
Nicolae Bălcescu National College, Brăila

- Nicolae Bălcescu National College, Brăila
- Ana Aslan National College, Brăila
- Gheorghe Munteanu-Murgoci National College, Brăila
- Ion Ghica Economics College (Brăila)
- George Vâlsan Theoretical High School, Brăila
- Panait Cerna Theoretical High School, Brăila
- Nicolae Iorga Theoretical High School, Brăila
- Mihai Sebastian Theoretical High School, Brăila
- Nicolae Oncescu Technological High School, Brăila
- Panait Istrati Technological High School, Brăila
- Grigore Moisil Technological High School, Brăila
- Gheorghe K. Constantinescu Technological High School, Brăila
- Anghel Saligny Technological High School (Brăila)
- Edmond Nicolau Technological High School, Brăila
- Costin D. Nenițescu Technical High School, Brăila
- D.P. Perpessicius Pedagogical High School, Brăila
- George Vâlsan Theoretical High School, Făurei
- Constantin Angelescu Theoretical High School, Ianca
- Nicolae Titulescu Technological High School, Însurăței
- Matei Basarab Technological High School, Măxineni

== Bucharest ==
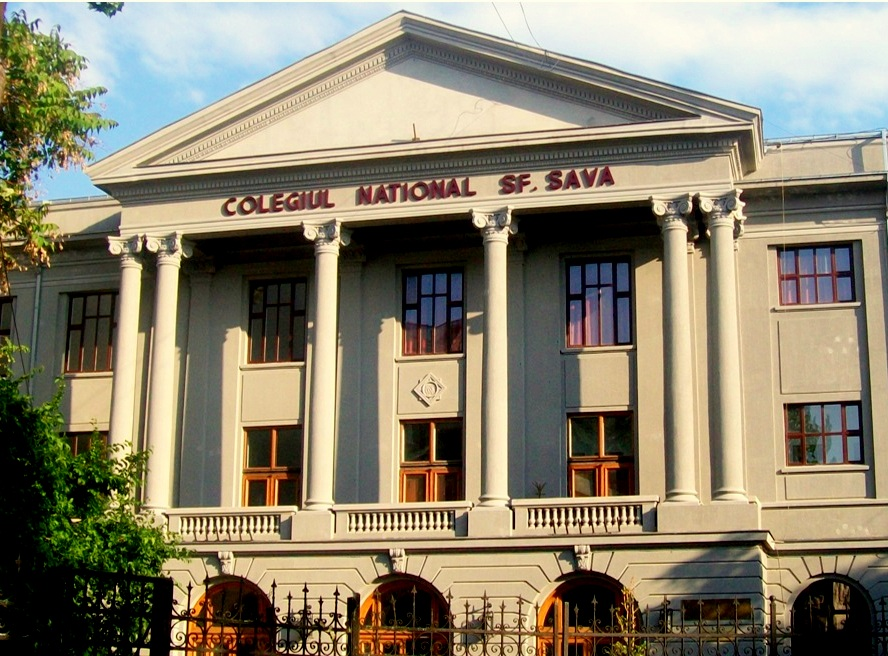
Saint Sava National College, Bucharest in March 2015

- Gheorghe Lazăr National College (Bucharest)
- Saint Sava National College
- Ion Luca Caragiale National College (Bucharest)
- Mihai Viteazul National College (Bucharest)
- Tudor Vianu National College of Computer Science
- Matei Basarab National College (Bucharest)
- Cantemir Vodă National College
- Mihai Eminescu National College (Bucharest)
- Iulia Hasdeu National College (Bucharest)
- Gheorghe Șincai National College (Bucharest)
- Spiru Haret National College
- Grigore Moisil National College (Bucharest)
- Elena Cuza National College (Bucharest)
- Școala Centrală National College (formerly "Zoya Kosmodeyanskaya")
- Aurel Vlaicu National College
- Ion Neculce National College
- George Coșbuc Bilingual National College
- Eugen Lovinescu Theoretical High School
- Jean Monnet Theoretical High School
- Alexandru Vlahuță Theoretical High School
- Constantin Brâncoveanu Theoretical High School
- Hristo Botev Theoretical High School
- Nicolae Iorga Theoretical High School
- Ștefan Odobleja Theoretical High School
- American International School of Bucharest
- International British School of Bucharest
- International Computer High School of Bucharest
- European School of Bucharest SEB
- Bucharest Christian Academy
- Goethe German College
- Miguel de Cervantes Bilingual College
- Edmond Nicolau Technical College
- Ioan N. Socolescu Technical College
- Carol I Technical College

== Buzău County ==
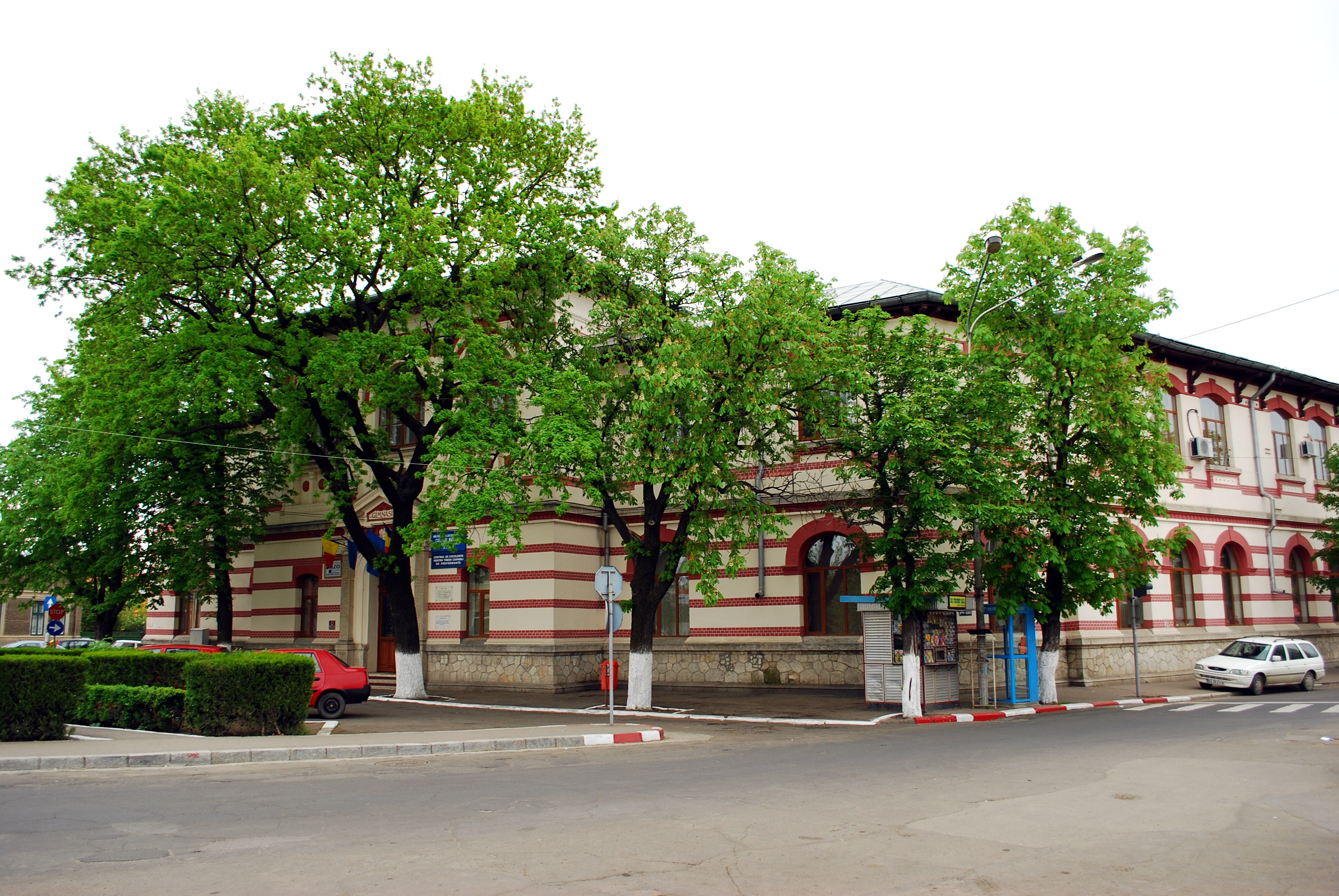
Bogdan Petriceicu Hasdeu National College

- Bogdan Petriceicu Hasdeu National College, Buzău
- Mihai Eminescu National College (Buzău)
- Alexandru Marghiloman Theoretical High School, Buzău
- Radu Vlădescu Theoretical High School, Buzău
- Grigore C. Moisil Technological High School, Buzău
- Henri Coandă Technological High School (Buzău)
- Dimitrie Filipescu Technological High School, Buzău
- Spiru Haret Pedagogical High School, Buzău
- Dr. Constantin Angelescu Agricultural High School, Buzău
- Iolanda Balaș Soter Sports High School, Buzău
- Buzău Technological High School of Trades and Services
- Buzău Economic College
- Buzău Technical College
- Mărgăriți Technological High School, Beceni
- Sfântul Mucenic Sava Technological High School, Berca
- Nicolae Iorga Theoretical High School, Nehoiu
- Radu Vlădescu Theoretical High School, Pătârlagele
- Pogoanele Theoretical High School
- Alexandru Vlahuță National College, Râmnicu Sărat
- Ștefan cel Mare Theoretical High School, Râmnicu Sărat
- Elina Matei Basarab Technological Economic High School, Râmnicu Sărat
- Victor Frunză Technological High School, Râmnicu Sărat
- Traian Săvulescu Technological High School, Râmnicu Sărat
- Agricultural Technological High School, Smeeni
- Vernești Technological High School

== Caraș-Severin County ==
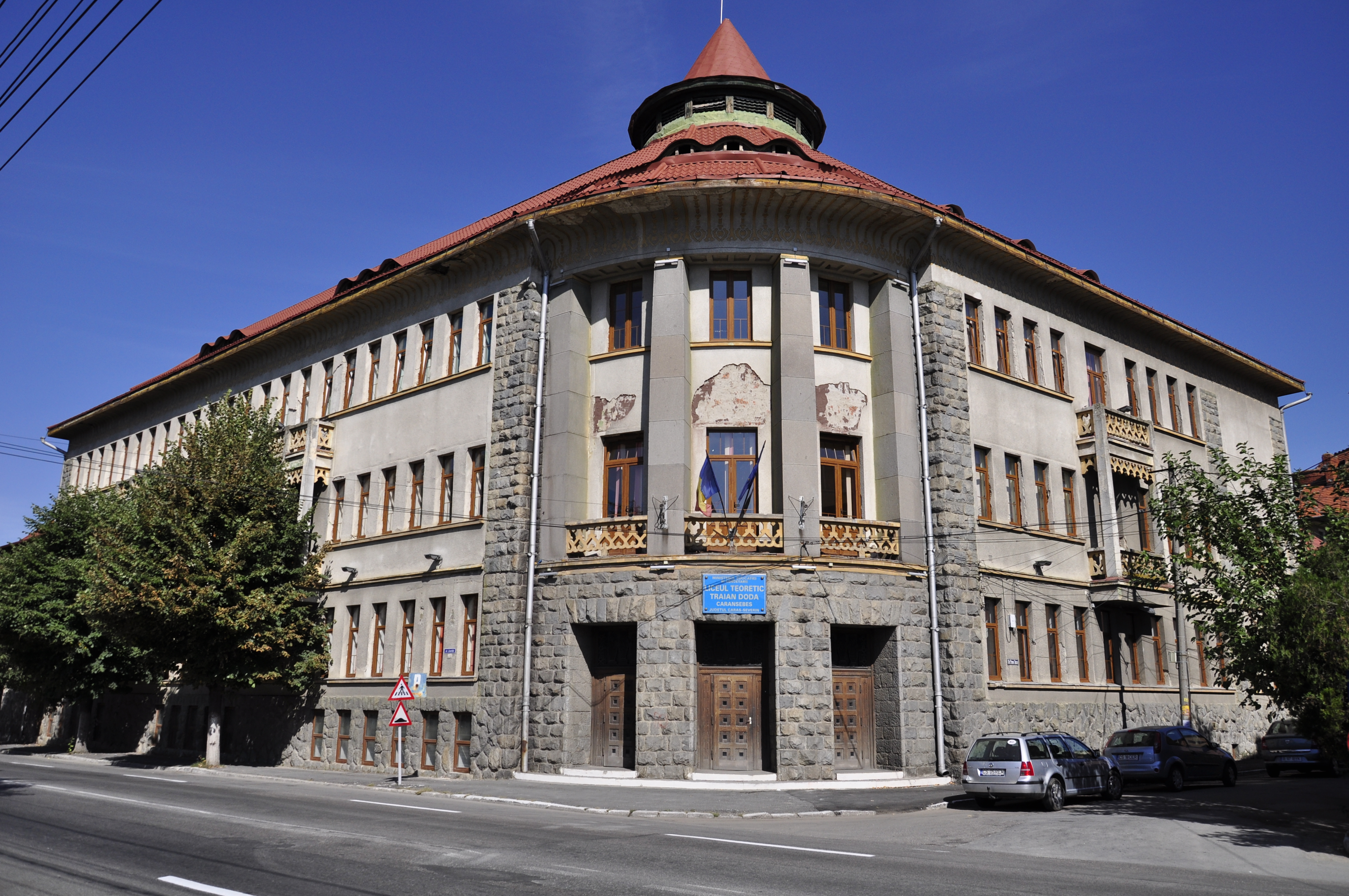
Traian Doda National College

- Traian Doda National College, Caransebeș
- Constantin Diaconovici Loga National College (Caransebeș)
- Hercules High School, Băile Herculane
- General Dragalina Theoretical High School, Oravița
- Bănățean High School, Oțelu Roșu
- Diaconovici-Tietz National College, Reșița
- Tata Oancea Theoretical High School, Reșița
- Traian Lalescu Theoretical High School, Reșița
- Traian Vuia Theoretical High School, Reșița

== Călărași County ==
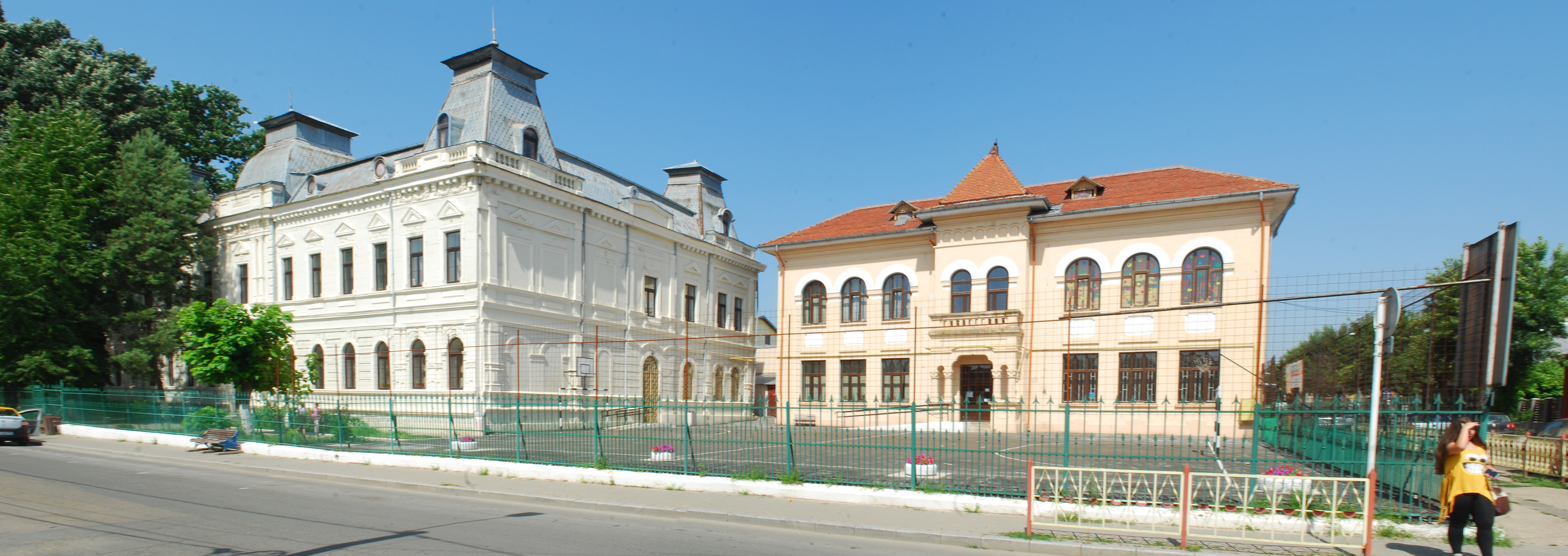
Barbu Știrbei National College, Călărași

- Barbu Știrbei National College, Călărași
- Mihai Eminescu Theoretical High School, Călărași
- Ștefan Bănulescu Technical High School, Călărași
- Danubius High School, Călărași
- Sandu Aldea Agricultural College, Călărași
- Călărași Economics College
- Duiliu Zamfirescu Technological High School, Dragalina
- Fundulea Technologic High School
- Constantin George Călinescu Technologic High School, Grădiștea
- Alexandru Odobescu High School, Lehliu Gară
- Neagoe Basarab High School, Oltenița
- Ion Ghica Technologic High School, Oltenița
- Nicolae Bălcescu Technologic High School, Oltenița

== Cluj County ==
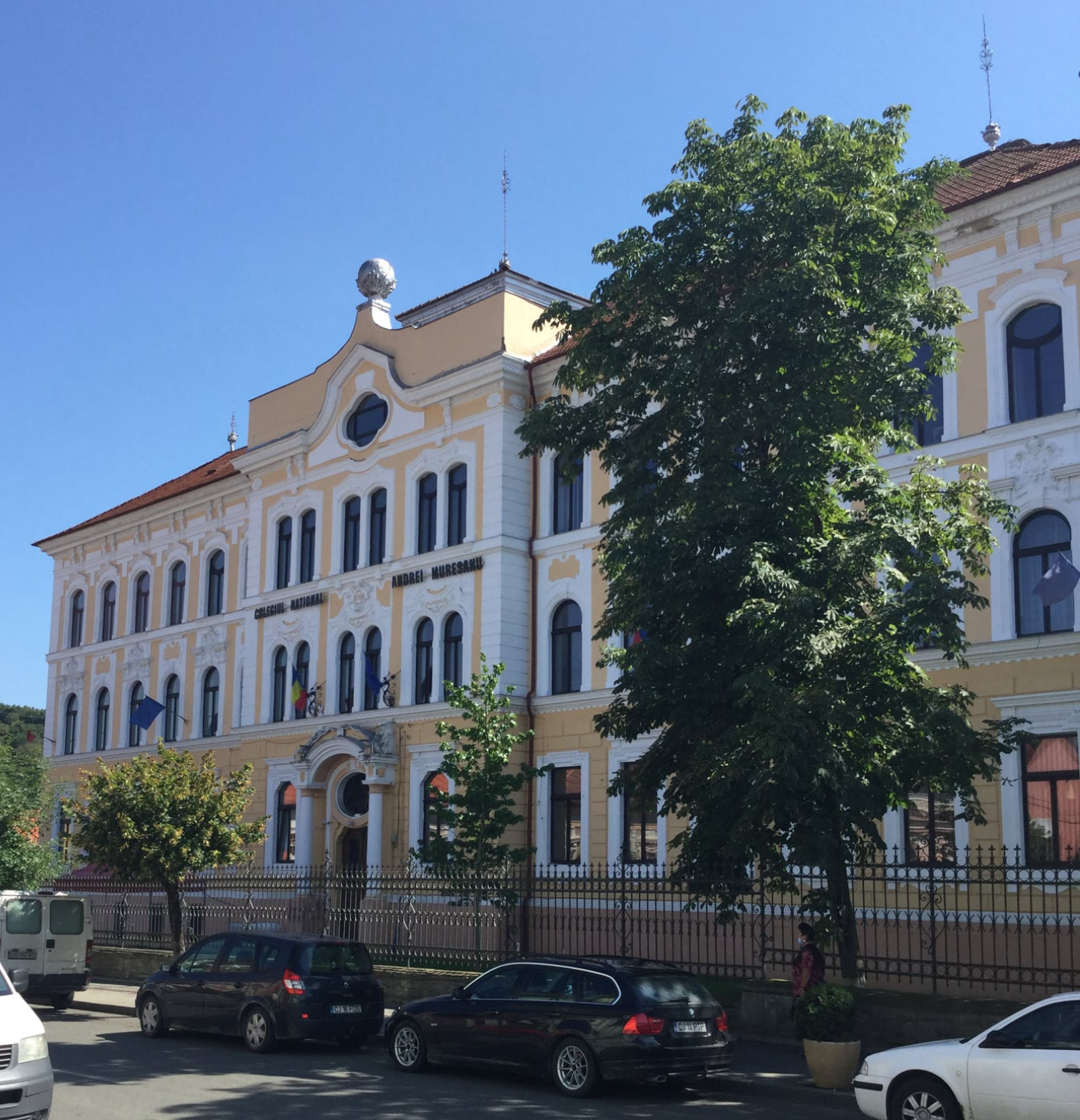
Andrei Mureșanu National College, Dej

- Emil Racoviță National College, Cluj-Napoca
- George Coșbuc National College (Cluj-Napoca)
- George Barițiu National College, Cluj-Napoca
- Gheorghe Lazăr National Pedagogical College, Cluj-Napoca
- Tiberiu Popoviciu High School of Computer Science, Cluj-Napoca
- Mihai Eminescu High School (Cluj-Napoca)
- István Báthory High School, Cluj-Napoca
- János Apáczai Csere High School, Cluj-Napoca
- John Sigismund Unitarian Academy, Cluj-Napoca
- Inocențiu Micu Theological High School, Cluj-Napoca
- Andrei Mureșanu National College (Dej)
- Petru Maior Theoretical High School, Gherla
- Ana Ipătescu Theoretical High School, Gherla
- Gherla Technologic High School
- Mihai Viteazul National College (Turda)

== Constanța County ==
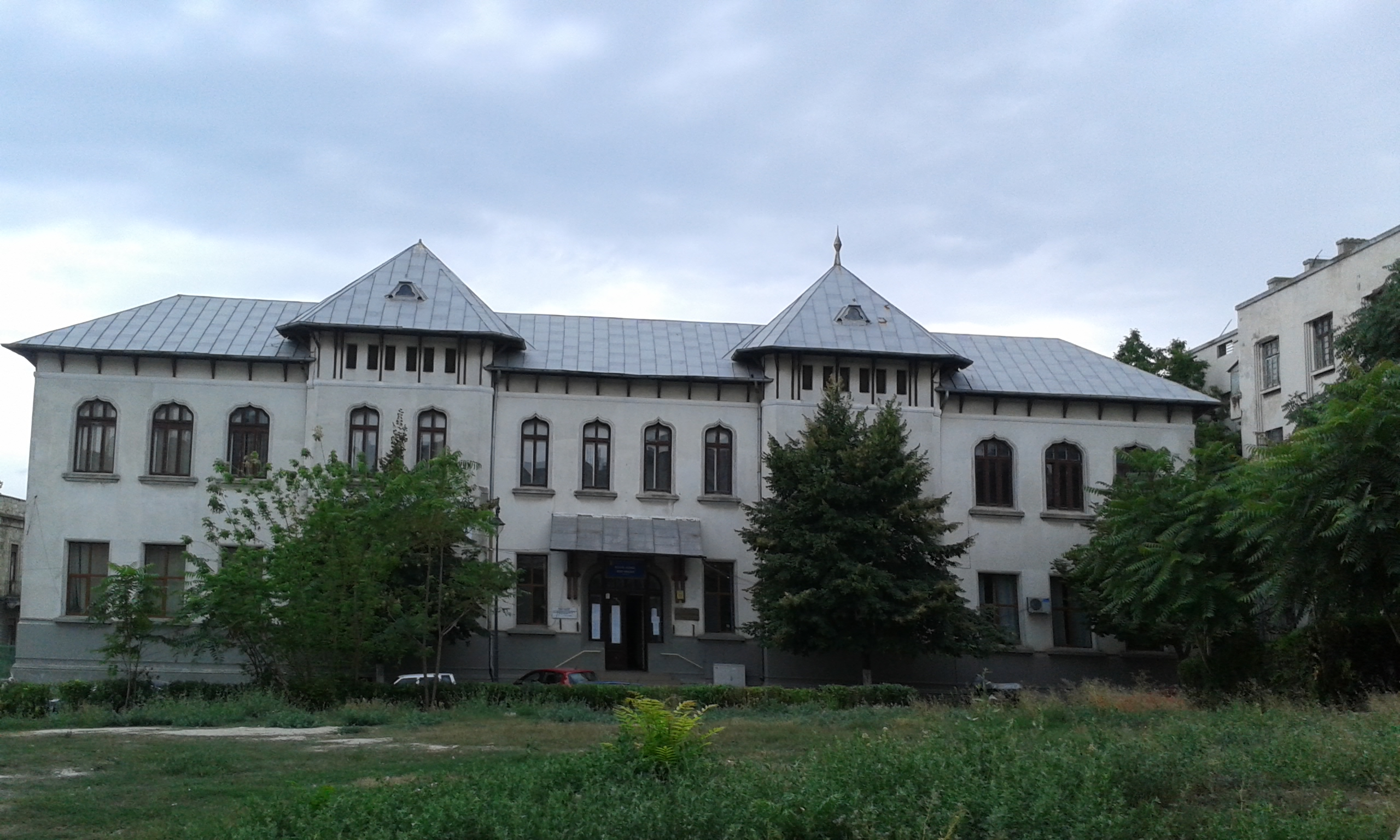
Mihai Eminescu National College, Constanța

- Mircea cel Bătrân National College (Constanța)
- Mihai Eminescu National College (Constanța)
- Constantin Brătescu National Pedagogical College
- Carol I Economic College, Constanța
- Pontica Technical College of Constanța
- Tomis Technical College, Constanța
- Queen Marie National College of Arts, Constanța
- Decebal High School, Constanța
- Ovidius High School, Constanța
- Traian High School, Constanța
- Lucian Blaga High School, Constanța
- George Călinescu High School, Constanța
- Dimitrie Leonida High School, Constanța
- International Computer Science High School of Constanța
- Electrotechnics and Telecommunication High School, Constanța
- Nicolae Rotaru Sports High School, Constanța
- Orthodox Theological Seminary, Constanța
- Callatis High School, Mangalia

== Covasna County ==
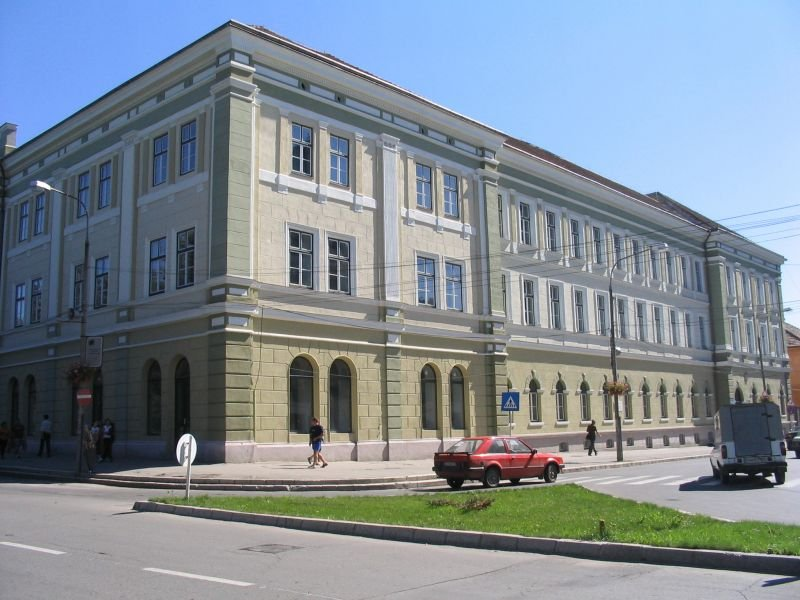
Székely Mikó National College, Sfântu Gheorghe

- Mihai Viteazul National College (Sfântu Gheorghe)
- Székely Mikó National College, Sfântu Gheorghe
- Puskás Tivadar Technological High School, Sfântu Gheorghe
- Mikes Kelemen High School, Sfântu Gheorghe
- Plugor Sándor Art High School, Sfântu Gheorghe
- Reformed Theological High School (Sfântu Gheorghe)
- Berde Áron Technological High School, Sfântu Gheorghe
- Baróti Szabó Dávid Technological High School, Baraolt
- Kőrösi Csoma Sándor High School, Covasna
- Mircea Eliade Theoretical High School (Întorsura Buzăului)
- Nicolae Bălcescu Technological High School (Întorsura Buzăului)
- Nagy Mózes Theoretical High School, Târgu Secuiesc
- Bod Péter Pedagogical High School, Târgu Secuiesc
- Reformed Theological High School (Târgu Secuiesc)

== Dâmbovița County ==
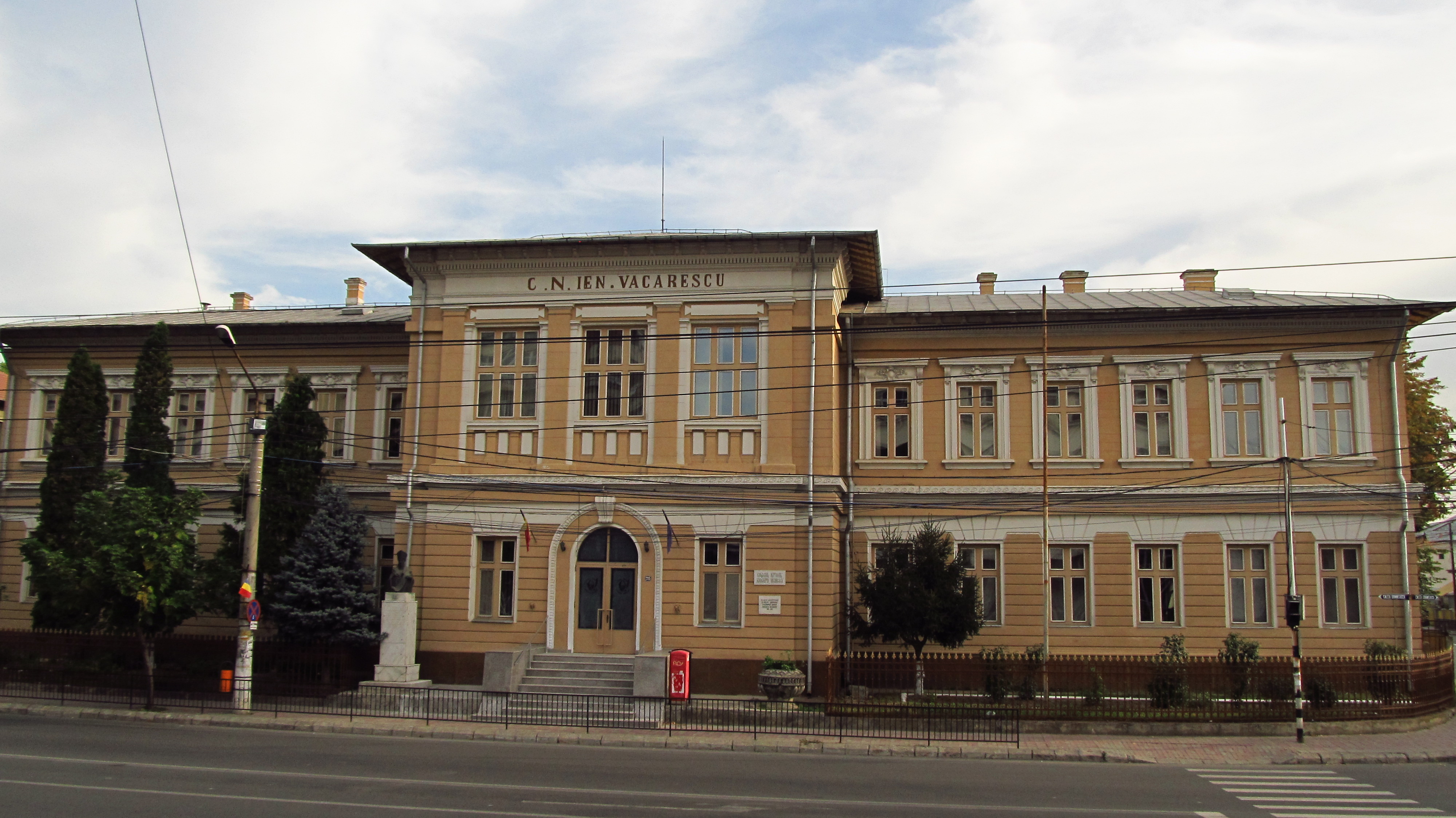
Ienăchiță Văcărescu National College

- Ienăchiță Văcărescu National College, Târgoviște
- Constantin Carabella National College, Târgoviște
- Constantin Cantacuzino National Pedagogical College, Târgoviște
- Ion Ghica Economics College (Târgoviște)
- Petru Cercel Theoretical High School, Târgoviște
- Ion Heliade Rădulescu Theoretical High School, Târgoviște
- Constantin Brâncoveanu Technological High School, Târgoviște
- Nicolae Ciorănescu Technological High School, Târgoviște
- Voievodul Mircea High School, Târgoviște
- Udrea Băleanu Technological High School, Băleni
- Iordache Golescu Technological High School, Găești
- Dr. C. Angelescu Technological High School, Găești
- Moreni Petroleum Technological High School
- Nucet Technological High School
- Nicolae Titulescu Național College, Pucioasa
- Pucioasa Technological High School
- Iancu C. Vissarion Theoretical High School, Titu
- Goga Ionescu Technological High School, Titu
- Mihai Viteazul Theoretical High School (Vișina)
- Voinești Technological High School

== Dolj County ==
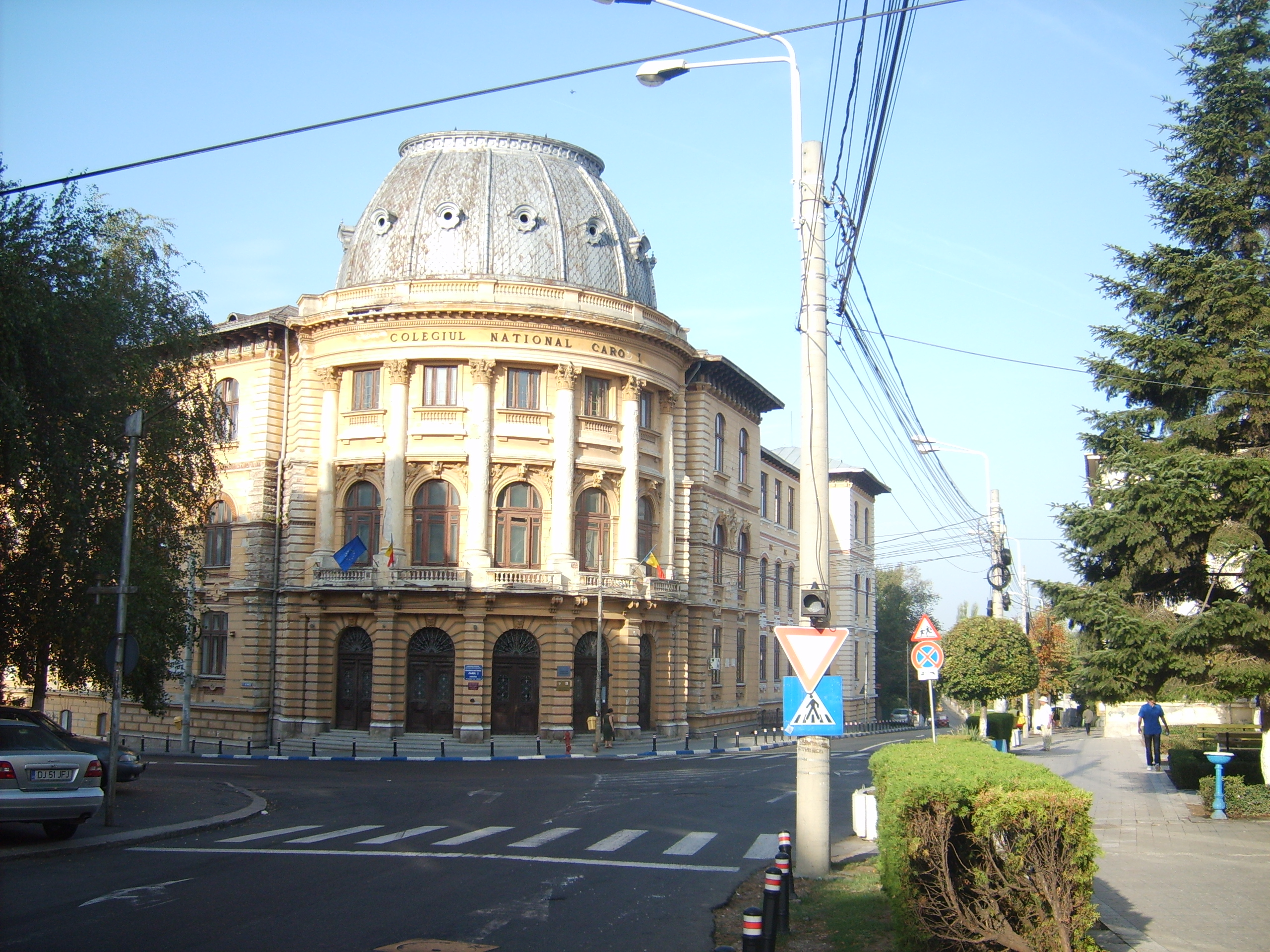
Carol I National College, Craiova

- Carol I National College, Craiova
- Frații Buzești National College, Craiova
- Elena Cuza National College (Craiova)
- Ștefan Odobleja Technological High School, Craiova

== Galați County ==
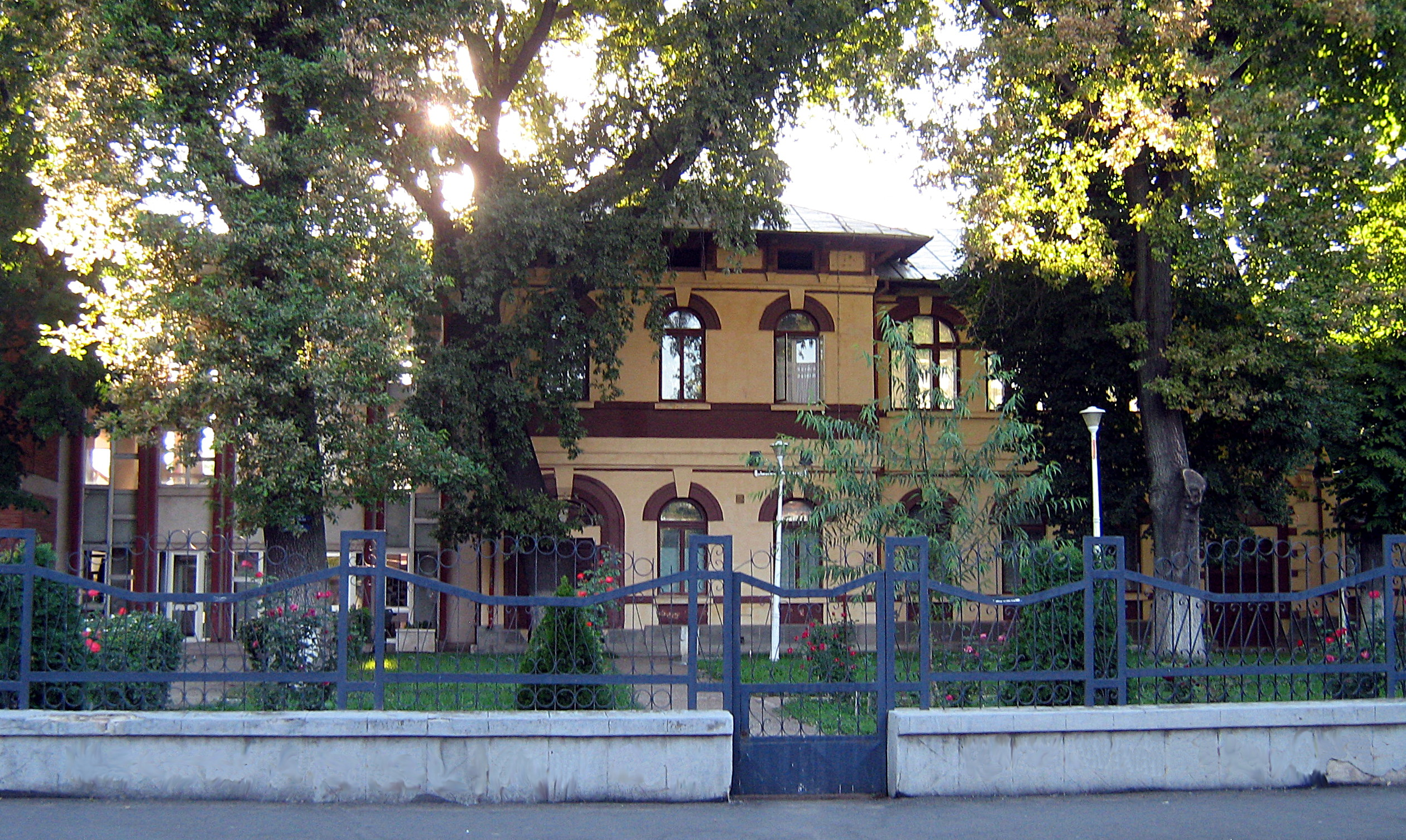
Vasile Alecsandri National College, Galați

- Vasile Alecsandri National College (Galați)
- Alexandru Ioan Cuza National College (Galați)
- Costache Negri National College, Galați
- Mihail Kogălniceanu National College, Galați
- Dunărea Theoretical High School, Galați
- Emil Racoviță Theoretical High School, Galați
- Mircea Eliade Theoretical High School (Galați)
- Sfânta Maria Theoretical High School, Galați
- Aurel Vlaicu Technical High School, Galați
- Traian Vuia Technical High School, Galați
- Paul Dimo Technical High School, Galați
- Radu Negru Technical High School, Galați
- Anghel Saligny Technological High School, Galați
- Maritime Technological High School, Galați
- Railway Transport Technological High School, Galați
- Paul Bujor Technological High School, Berești
- Technological High School Nr. 1, Corod
- Technological High School Nr. 1, Cudalbi
- Hortensia Papadat Bengescu Technological High School, Ivești
- Costache Conachi Technological High School, Pechea
- Eremia Grigorescu Technological High School, Târgu Bujor
- Calistrat Hogaș National College, Tecuci
- Elena Caragiani Technological High School, Tecuci
- Ovid Caledoniu Technological High School, Tecuci
- Tudor Vladimirescu Technological High School, Tudor Vladimirescu

== Giurgiu County ==
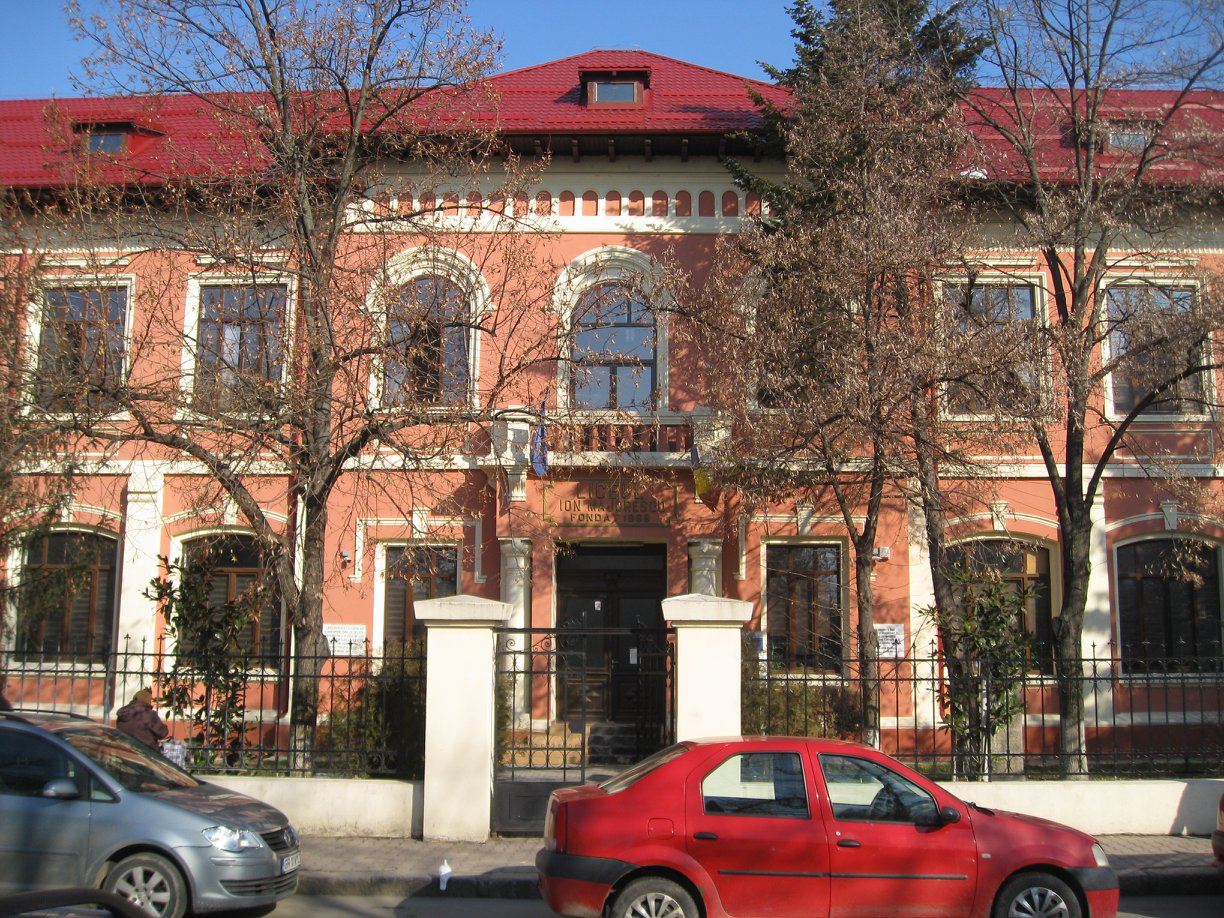
Ion Maiorescu National College, Giurgiu

- Ion Maiorescu National College, Giurgiu
- Nicolae Cartojan Theoretical High School, Giurgiu
- Tudor Vianu Theoretical High School, Giurgiu
- Ion Barbu Technological High School, Giurgiu

== Gorj County ==
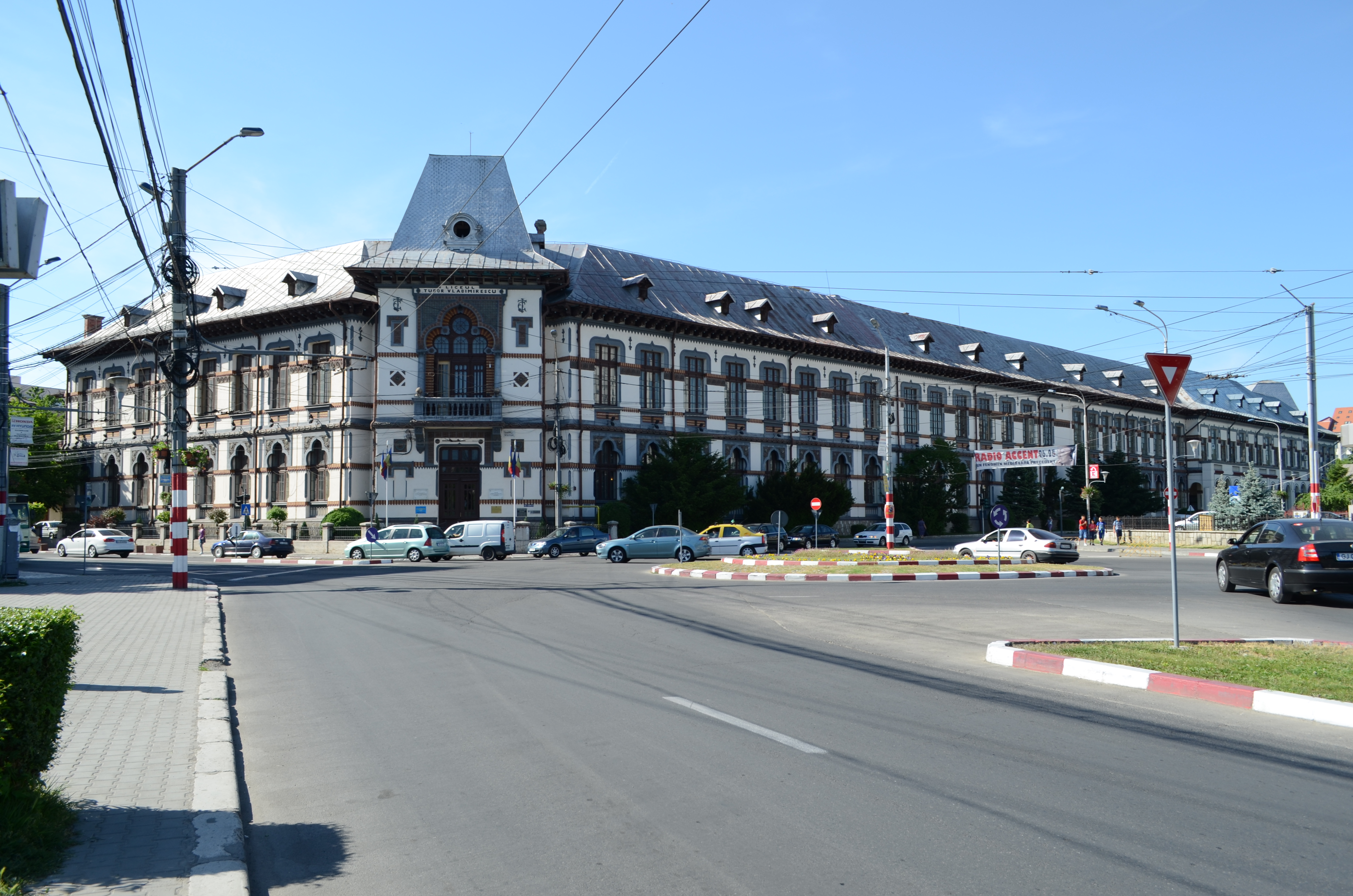
Tudor Vladimirescu National College, Târgu Jiu

- Tudor Vladimirescu National College, Târgu Jiu
- Ecaterina Teodoriu National College, Târgu Jiu
- Spiru Haret National College, Târgu Jiu
- Henri Coandă Technical College, Târgu Jiu
- Ion Mincu Technical College, Târgu Jiu
- Traian Vuia Auto College, Târgu Jiu
- General Gheorghe Magheru Technical College, Târgu Jiu
- Virgil Madgearu Economic College, Târgu Jiu
- Constantin Brăiloiu Music and Arts High School, Târgu Jiu
- Bârsești Technological High School, Târgu Jiu
- Baia de Fier Technological High School
- Bâlteni Technological High School
- Mihai Viteazul College, Bumbești-Jiu
- Roșia-Jiu Technological High School, Fărcășești
- George Coșbuc National College, Motru
- Motru Technical College
- Roșia de Amaradia Technological High School
- Gheorghe Tătărescu College, Rovinari
- Tudor Arghezi National College, Târgu Cărbunești

== Harghita County ==
- Ernő Salamon High School, Gheorgheni
- Áron Márton National College, Miercurea Ciuc
- Áron Tamási Theoretical High School, Odorheiu Secuiesc

== Hunedoara County ==
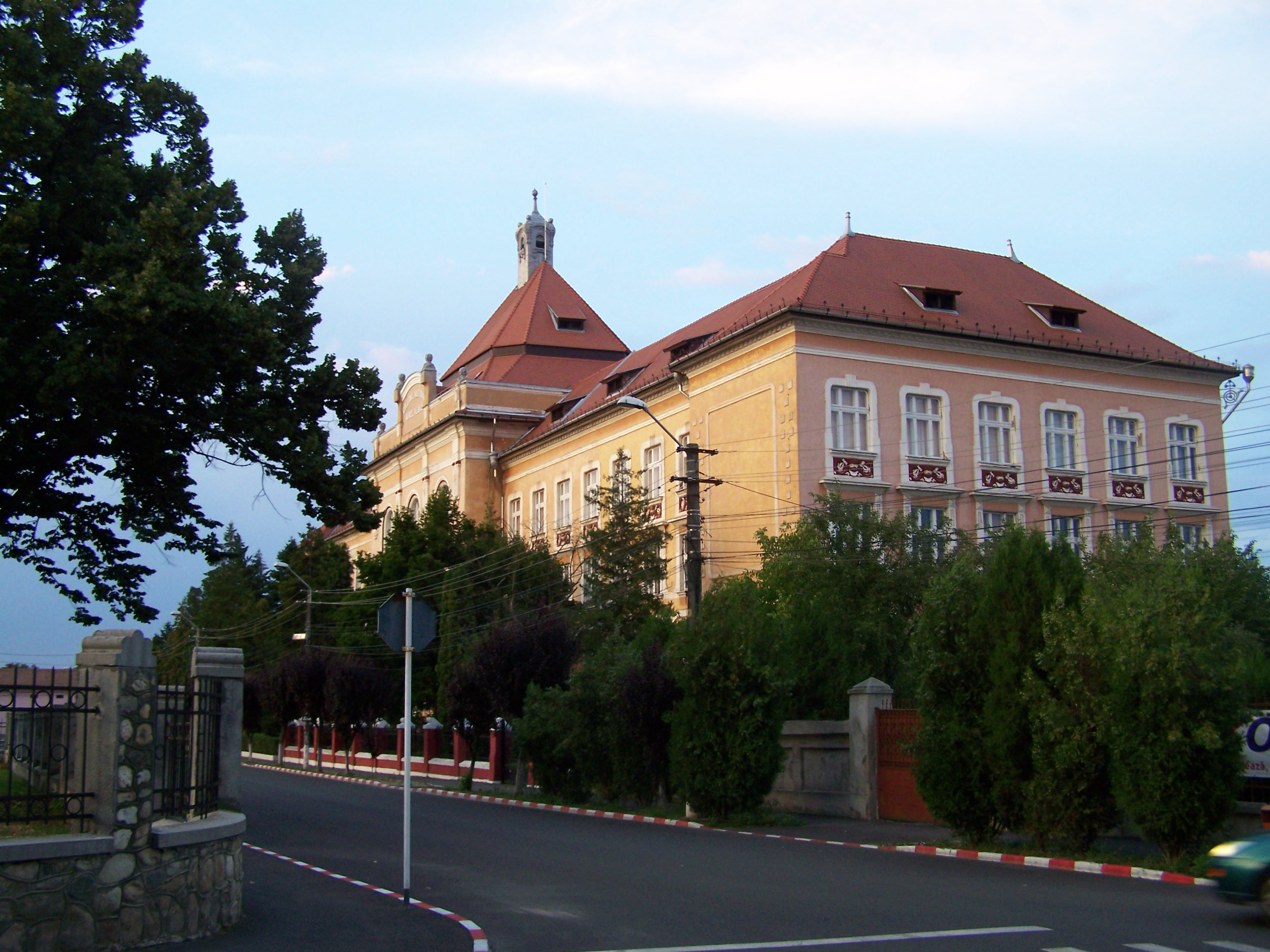
Aurel Vlaicu High School, Orăștie

- Decebal National College, Deva
- Ion Mincu College, Deva
- Cetate National Sport College, Deva
- Transilvania Technical College, Deva
- Dragomir Hurmuzescu Energetic College, Deva
- Grigore Moisil School Group, Deva
- Sabin Drăgoi Pedagogical High School, Deva
- Traian Theoretical High School, Deva
- Catholic High School of Deva
- Avram Iancu Theoretical High School, Brad
- Iancu de Hunedoara National College, Hunedoara
- Traian Lalescu National College, Hunedoara
- Matei Corvin Technical College, Hunedoara
- Emanoil Gojdu Economic College, Hunedoara
- Telecommunications and Public Works School Group, Hunedoara
- Aurel Vlaicu High School (Orăștie)
- Mihai Eminescu Theoretical High School, Petroșani
- Hermes Economic College, Petroșani
- Dimitrie Leonida Technical College, Petroșani
- Informatics High School, Petroșani

== Ialomița County ==
- Mihai Viteazul National College (Slobozia)
- Alexandru Ioan Cuza Technological High School, Slobozia
- Ascension of the Lord Technological High School, Slobozia
- Matei Basarab Pedagogical High School, Slobozia
- Ionel Perlea Art School, Slobozia
- Iordache Zossima Technological High School, Armășești
- Carol I Theoretical High School, Fetești
- Anghel Saligny Technological High School, Fetești
- Fetești Agroindustrial Technological High School
- Fierbinți-Târg Technological High School
- Paul Georgescu Theoretical High School, Țăndărei
- Grigore Moisil High School, Urziceni
- Urziceni Technological High School
- Saint Ecaterina Technological High School, Urziceni

== Iași County ==
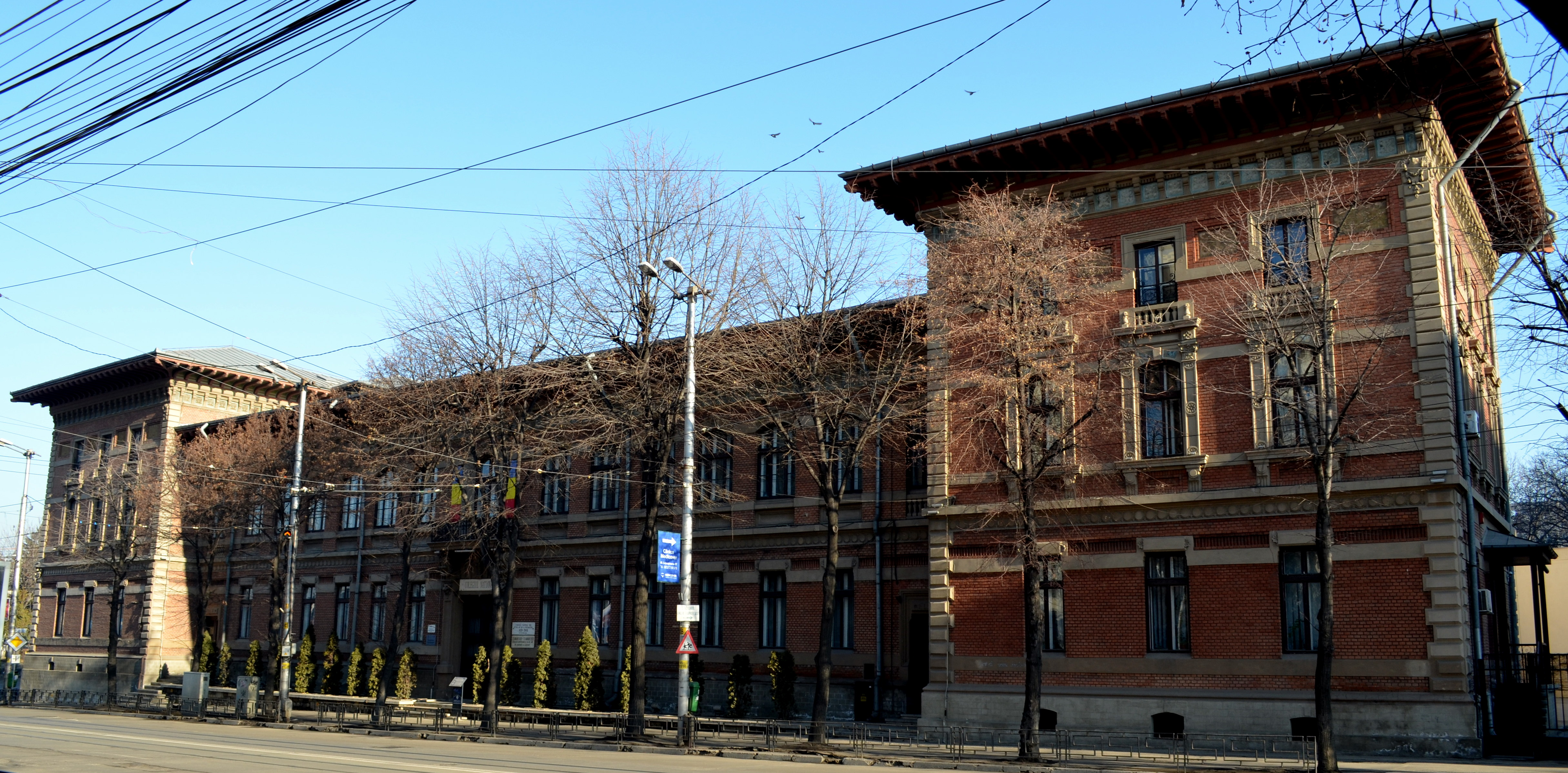
National College (Iași)

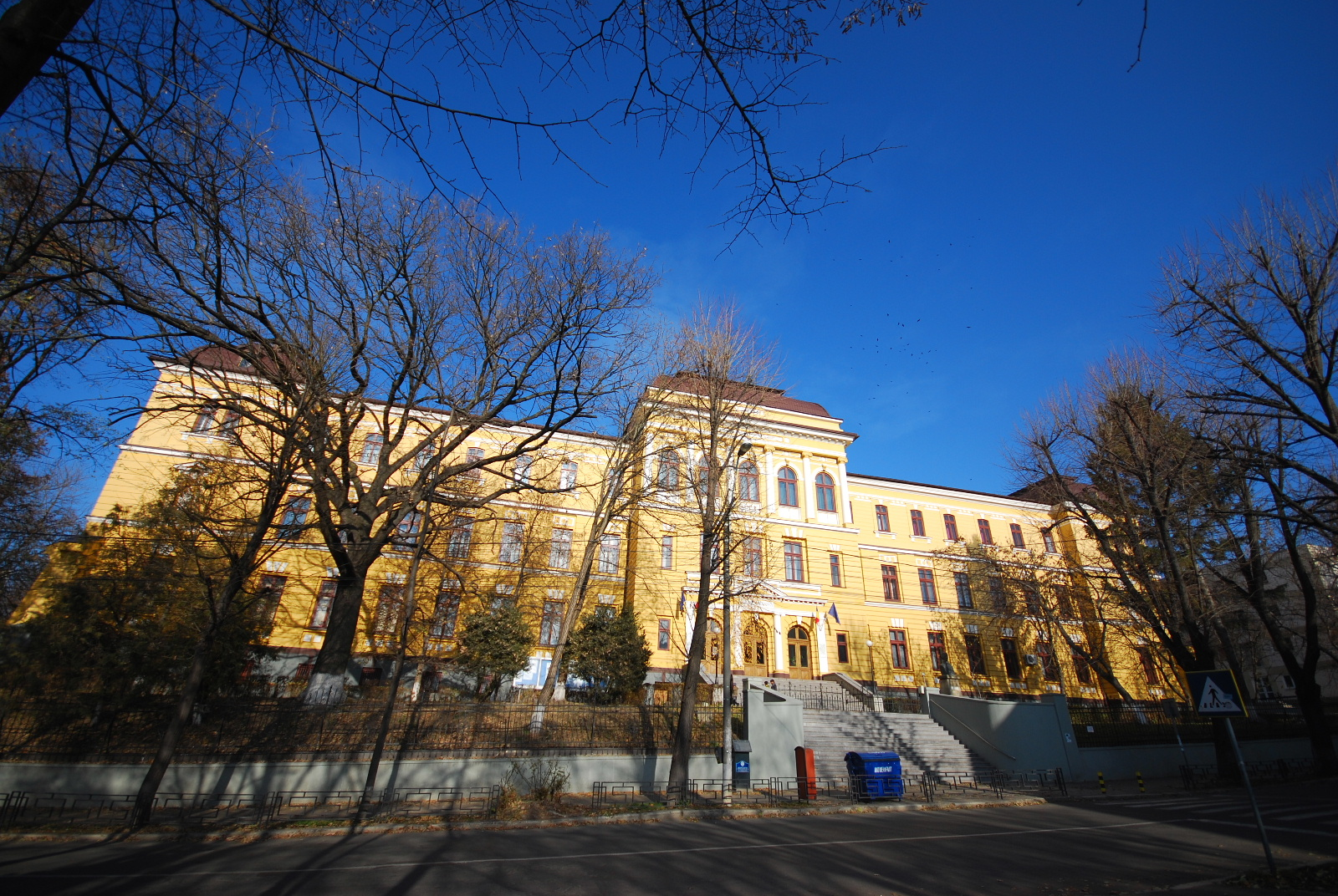
Costache Negruzzi National College, Iași

- National College (Iași)
- Costache Negruzzi National College, Iași
- Emil Racoviță National College, Iași
- Mihai Eminescu National College (Iași)
- Grigore Moisil Informatics High School, Iași
- Octav Băncilă National College of Arts, Iași
- Gheorghe Asachi Technical College, Iași
- Ioan C. Ștefănescu Technical College, Iași
- Vasile Lupu Pedagogical College, Iași
- Economic Administrative College Iași
- Gheorghe Mârzescu Technical College of Electronics and Telecommunications, Iași
- Richard Wurmbrand College, Iași
- Alexandru Ioan Cuza Theoretical High School, Iași
- Dimitrie Cantemir Theoretical High School, Iași
- Miron Costin Theoretical High School, Iași
- Vasile Alecsandri Theoretical High School, Iași
- Mihail Sturdza Technical College, Iași
- Waldorf High School, Iași
- Sports High School Iași
- Ștefan cel Mare Theoretical High School, Hârlău
- Mihail Sadoveanu Theoretical High School, Pașcani
- Bogdan Vodă Hălăucești High School, Pașcani
- Lascăr Rosetti Theoretical High School, Răducăneni
- Ion Neculce Theoretical High School, Târgu Frumos

== Ilfov County ==
- Traian Lalescu Theoretical High School, Brănești
- Cezar Nicolau Technological High School, Brănești
- Theodor Pietraru Forest College, Brănești
- Lady Chiajna Technological High School, Chiajna
- Horia Hulubei Theoretical High School, Măgurele
- Ioan Petruș Theoretical High School, Otopeni
- Mihail Kogălniceanu Theoretical High School, Snagov
- Alexandru Rosetti Theoretical High School, Vidra
- Popești-Leordeni Theoretical High School
- Periș High School

== Maramureș County ==
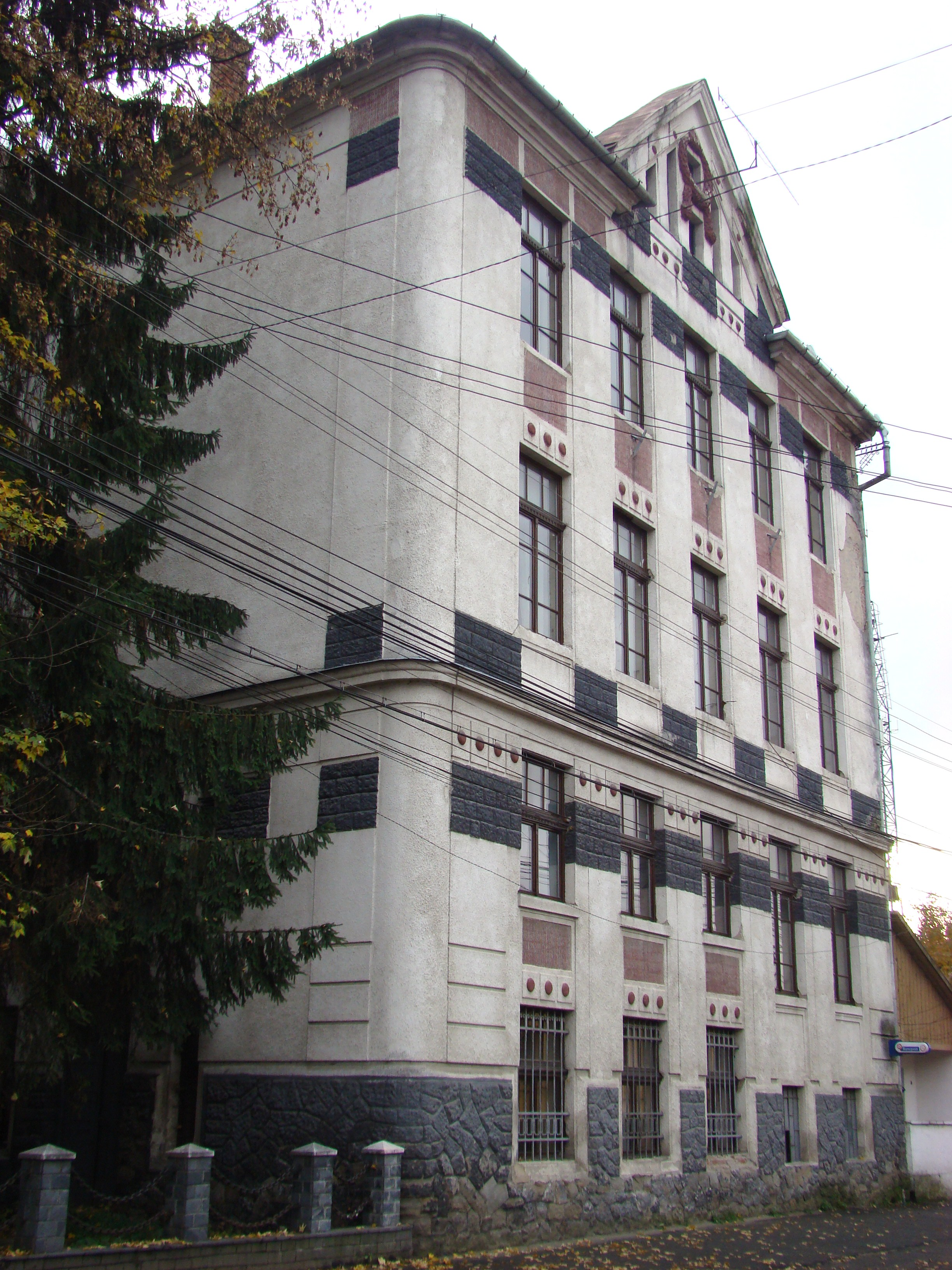
Dragoș Vodă National College, Sighetu Marmației

- Gheorghe Șincai National College (Baia Mare)
- Vasile Lucaciu National College, Baia Mare
- Mihai Eminescu National College (Baia Mare)
- Nicolae Titulescu Economics College, Baia Mare
- Anghel Saligny Technical College, Baia Mare
- Aurel Vlaicu Technical College, Baia Mare
- C.D. Nenițescu Technical College, Baia Mare
- George Barițiu Technical College, Baia Mare
- Transilvania Technical College, Baia Mare
- Baia Mare Arts High School
- Borșa High School
- Pintea Viteazul Economics College, Cavnic
- Alexandru Filipașcu Technological College, Petrova
- Dragoș Vodă National College (Sighetu Marmației)
- King Ferdinand Pedagogic High School, Sighetu Marmației
- Taras Shevchenko Pedagogic High School, Sighetu Marmației
- Ioan Buteanu Theoretical High School, Șomcuta Mare
- Petru Rareș Theoretical High School, Târgu Lăpuș
- Grigore C. Moisil Technological College, Târgu Lăpuș
- Florian Ulmeanu Technological College, Ulmeni

== Mehedinți County ==
- Traian National College, Drobeta-Turnu Severin,
- Gheorghe Țițeica National College, Drobeta-Turnu Severin
- National Economic College Theodor Costescu, Drobeta-Turnu Severin
- National Pedagogical College Ștefan Odobleja, Drobeta-Turnu Severin

== Mureș County ==
Alexandru Papiu Ilarian National College, Târgu Mureș

- Alexandru Papiu Ilarian National College, Târgu Mureș
- Unirea National College (Târgu Mureș)
- Farkas Bolyai Theoretical High School, Târgu Mureș
- Art High School of Târgu Mureș
- Catholic High School of Târgu Mureș
- Vocational Reformed High School, Târgu Mureș
- Traian Săvulescu Agricultural College, Târgu Mureș
- School on the Hill, Sighișoara

== Neamț County ==
- Petru Rareș National College (Piatra Neamț)
- Gheorghe Asachi National College, Piatra Neamț
- Calistrat Hogaș National College, Piatra Neamț
- Roman-Vodă National College, Roman
- Ștefan cel Mare National College, Târgu-Neamț

== Olt County ==
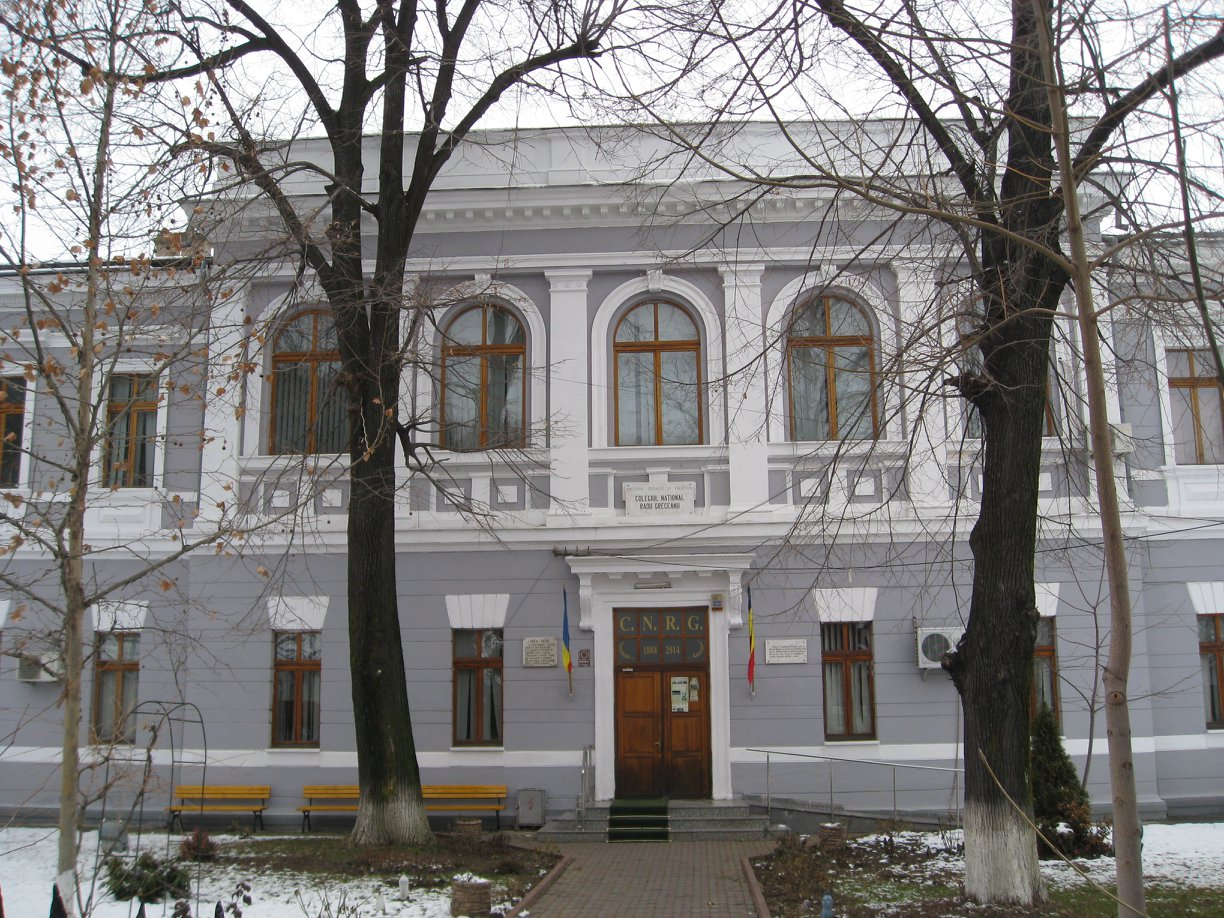
Radu Greceanu National College, Slatina

- Radu Greceanu National College, Slatina
- Ion Minulescu National College, Slatina
- Nicolae Titulescu Theoretical High School, Slatina
- Petre Pandrea Theoretical High School, Balș
- Ioniță Asan National College, Caracal
- Mihai Viteazul Theoretical High School (Caracal)
- Alexandru Ioan Cuza Theoretical High School, Corabia
- Tudor Vladimirescu Theoretical High School, Drăgănești-Olt
- Ion Gheorghe Roșca Theoretical High School, Osica de Sus
- Ștefan Diaconescu High School, Potcoava

== Prahova County ==
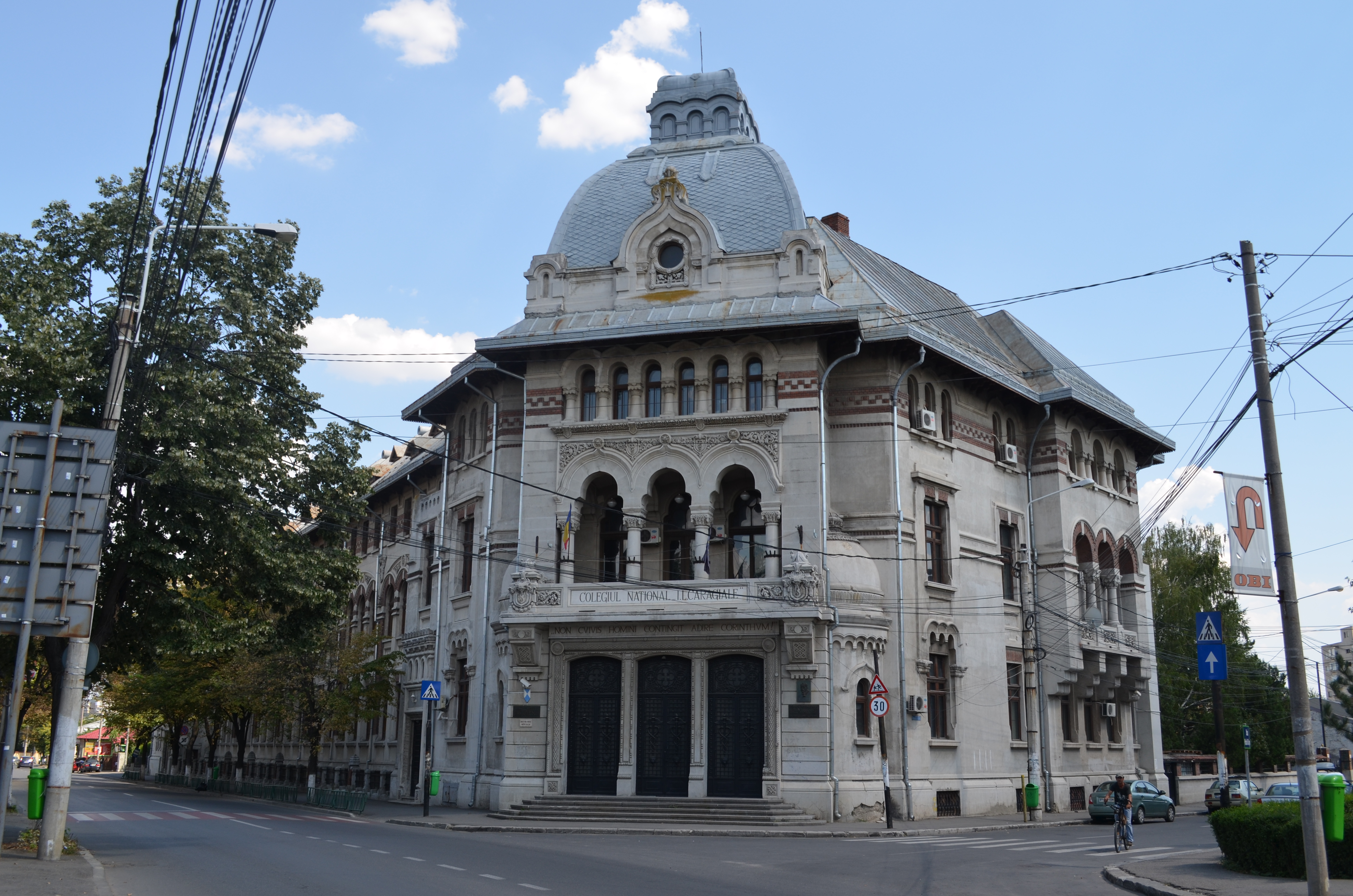
Ion Luca Caragiale National College, Ploiești

- Mihai Viteazul National College (Ploiești)
- Ion Luca Caragiale National College (Ploiești)
- Jean Monnet National College, Ploiești
- Virgil Madgearu Economic College, Ploiești
- Spiru Haret High School, Ploiești
- Alexandru Ioan Cuza National College (Ploiești)
- Nichita Stănescu National College, Ploiești
- Lazăr Edeleanu Technical College, Ploiești
- Carmen Sylva Art High School, Ploiești
- Constantin Brâncoveanu Military School, Ploiești
- Toma N. Socolescu High School, Ploiești
- Victor Slăvescu Technologic, Administration and Service High School, Ploiești
- Bărcănești Agricultural Technologic High School
- Dimitrie Cantemir Military National College, Breaza
- Nicolae Grigorescu Național College, Câmpina
- Constantin Istrati Technical High School, Câmpina
- Simion Stolnicu High School, Comarnic
- Filipeștii de Pădure Theoretical High School
- Ferdinand I College, Măneciu
- Tase Dumitrescu Technologic High School, Mizil
- Gheorghe Ionescu-Sisești Technologic High School, Valea Călugărească
- Carol I Technologic High School, Valea Doftanei

== Satu Mare County ==
- Doamna Stanca National College (Satu Mare)
- Ioan Slavici National College, Satu Mare
- Kölcsey Ferenc National College, Satu Mare
- Mihai Eminescu National College (Satu Mare)
- UNIO High School, Satu Mare
- Gheorghe Dragoș College of Economics, Satu Mare
- János Hám Roman Catholic Theological School, Satu Mare
- Industrial School Group in Tășnad

== Sălaj County ==
- Silvania National College, Zalău
- Alesandru Papiu Ilarian Technical College, Zalău
- Simion Bărnuțiu National College, Șimleu Silvaniei
- Iuliu Maniu Technical College, Șimleu Silvaniei

== Sibiu County ==
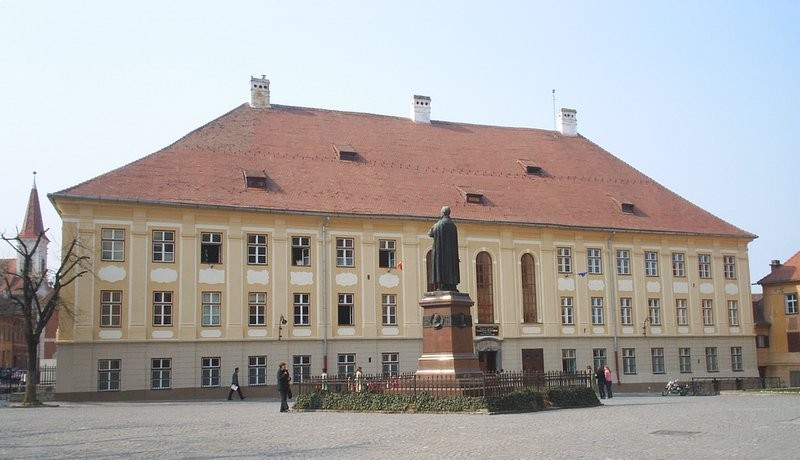
Samuel von Brukenthal National College, Sibiu

- Gheorghe Lazăr National College (Sibiu)
- Samuel von Brukenthal National College, Sibiu
- Octavian Goga National College, Sibiu
- Andrei Șaguna National College (Sibiu)
- George Barițiu Economic College, Sibiu
- Onisifor Ghibu Theoretical High School, Sibiu
- Constantin Noica Theoretical High School, Sibiu
- Energy Technical College, Sibiu
- Cibinum Technical College, Sibiu
- Daniil Popovici Barcianu Agricultural College, Sibiu
- Avram Iancu Technological High School, Sibiu
- August Treboniu Laurian Technical College, Agnita
- Gustav Gundisch Theoretical High School, Cisnădie
- Cisnădie Technological High School
- Nicolae Teclu Technological High School, Copșa Mică
- Timotei Cipariu High School, Dumbrăveni
- Dumbrăveni Theoretical High School
- Axente Sever Theoretical High School, Mediaș
- Stephan Ludwig Roth Theoretical High School, Mediaș
- Mediensis Technical College, Mediaș
- Automecanica Technological College, Mediaș
- National School of Gas College, Mediaș
- Ilie Măcelariu Technological High School, Miercurea Sibiului
- Ioan Lupaș Technological High School, Săliște
- Johannes Lebel Technological High School, Tălmaciu

== Suceava County ==
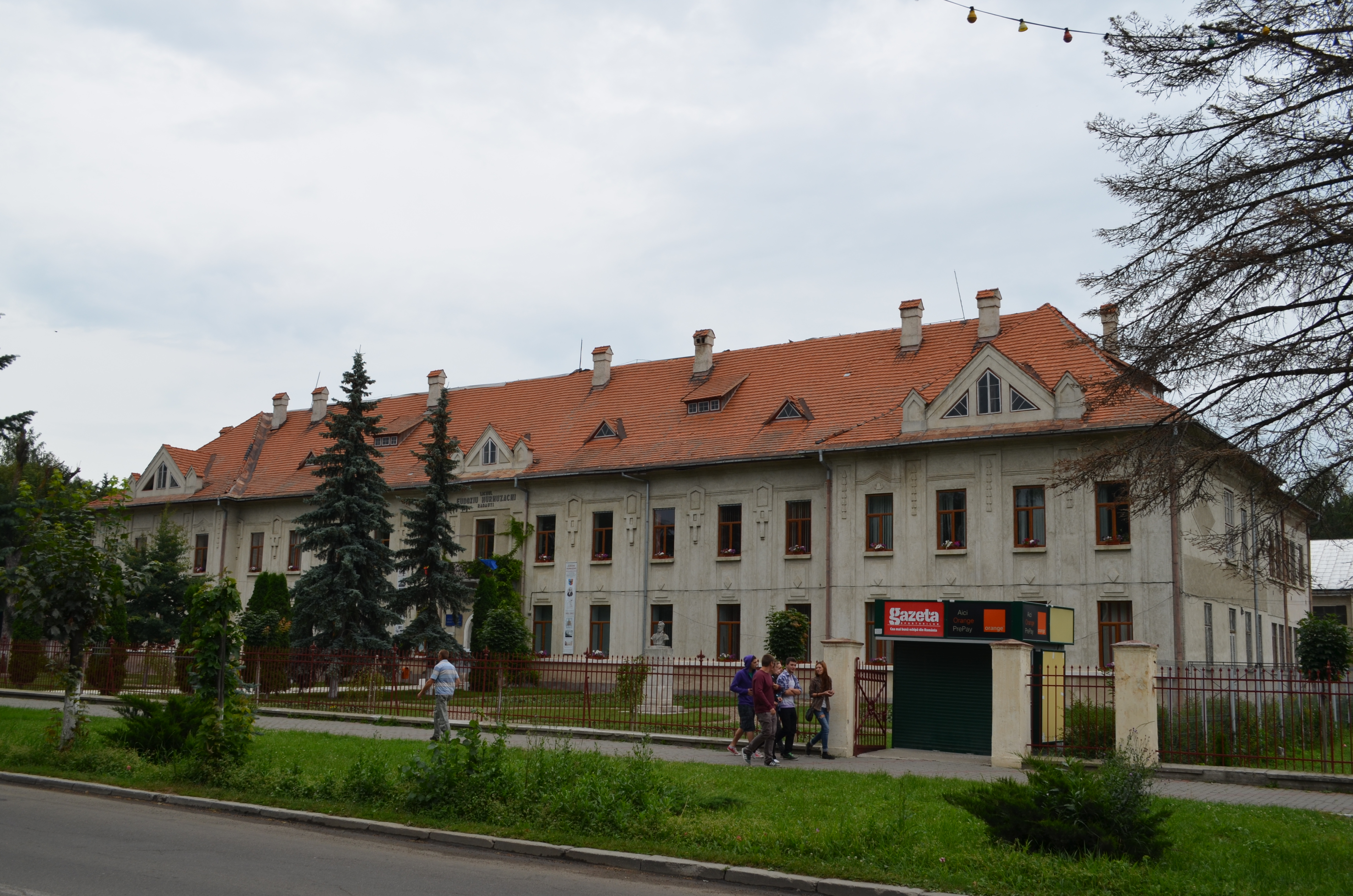
Eudoxiu Hurmuzachi National College, Rădăuți

- Dragoș Vodă National College (Câmpulung Moldovenesc)
- Ștefan cel Mare National Military College, Câmpulung Moldovenesc
- Eudoxiu Hurmuzachi National College, Rădăuți
- Petru Rareș National College (Suceava)
- Ștefan cel Mare National College, Suceava
- Spiru Haret National Informatics College, Suceava
- Ciprian Porumbescu Art College, Suceava

== Teleorman County ==
- Alexandru D. Ghica National College, Alexandria
- Alexandru Ioan Cuza Theoretical High School, Alexandria
- Constantin Noica Theoretical High School, Alexandria
- Nicolae Bălcescu Technological High School, Alexandria
- Andrei Șaguna Technological High School, Botoroaga
- Drăgănești-Vlașca Technological High School
- Măgureni Technological High School
- Olteni Theoretical High School
- Piatra Theoretical High School
- Anastasescu National College, Roșiorii de Vede
- Anghel Saligny Technical High School, Roșiorii de Vede
- Virgil Madgearu Technological High School, Roșiorii de Vede
- Unirea National College (Turnu Măgurele)
- Marin Preda Theoretical High School, Turnu Măgurele
- Saint Charalambos Technological High School, Turnu Măgurele
- Zimnicea High School

== Timiș County ==
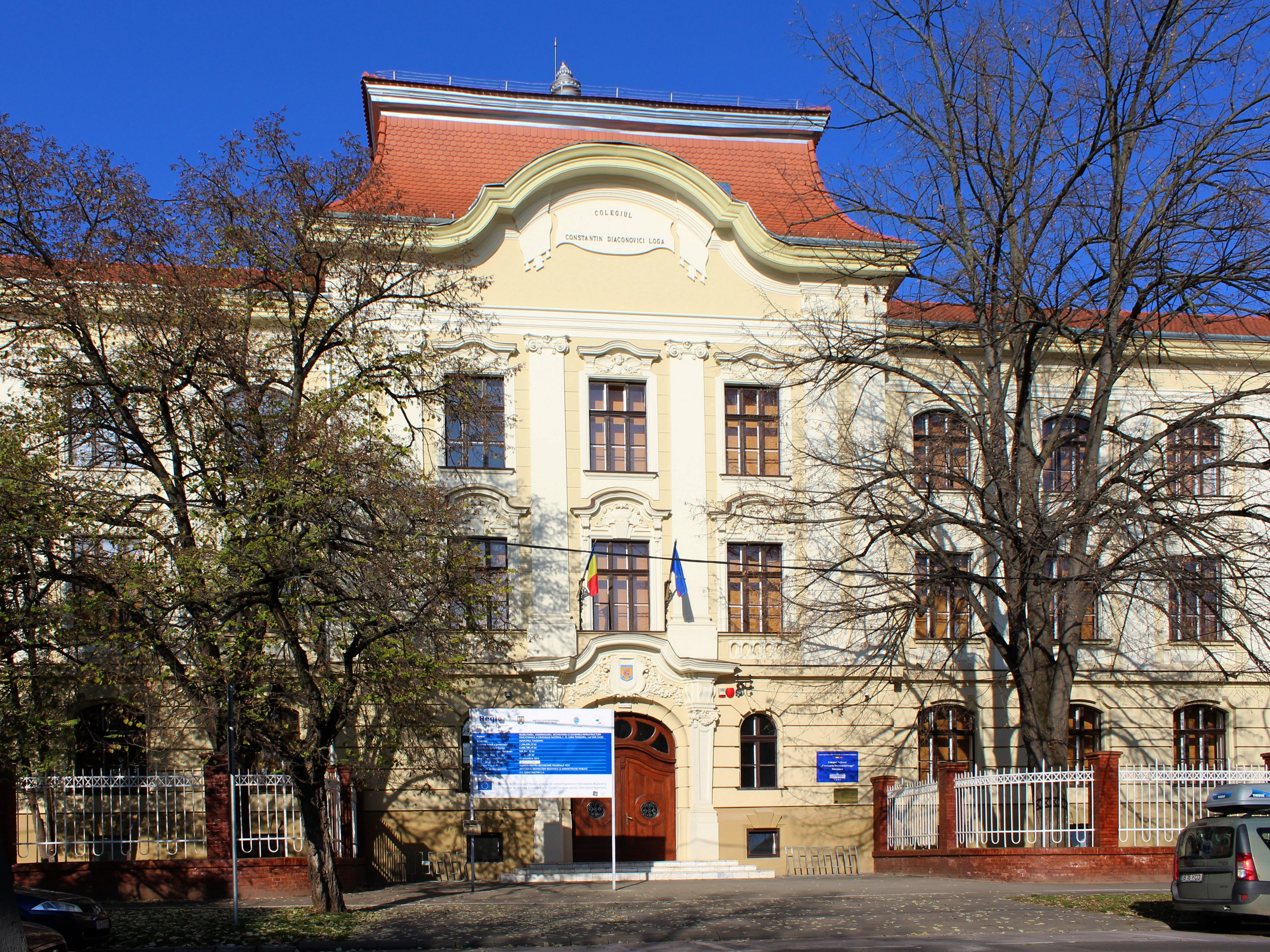
Constantin Diaconovici Loga National College, Timișoara

- Constantin Diaconovici Loga National College (Timișoara)
- Banat National College, Timișoara
- Carmen Sylva National Pedagogical College, Timișoara
- Ana Aslan National College (Timișoara)
- Jean Louis Calderon High School, Timișoara
- William Shakespeare High School, Timișoara
- Béla Bartók High School
- Nikolaus Lenau High School, Timișoara
- Dositej Obradović High School, Timișoara
- Vlad Țepeș High School, Timișoara
- Grigore Moisil High School (Timișoara)
- Plastic Arts High School of Timișoara
- Ion Vidu National College of Art, Timișoara
- Piarist High School (Timișoara)
- Francesco Saverio Nitti Economic College, Timișoara
- West Technical College, Timișoara
- Iulia Hasdeu National College (Lugoj)
- Coriolan Brediceanu National College, Lugoj

== Tulcea County ==
- Spiru Haret Dobrujan College, Tulcea
- Grigore Moisil Theoretical High School (Tulcea)
- Ion Creangă Theoretical High School, Tulcea
- Anghel Saligny Technological High School (Tulcea)
- Brad Segal Technological High School, Tulcea
- Henri Coandă Technological High School (Tulcea)
- Dimitrie Cantemir High School (Babadag)
- Constantin Brătescu Theoretical High School, Isaccea
- Gheorghe Munteanu Murgoci Theoretical High School, Măcin
- Măcin Technological High School
- Jean Bart Theoretical High School, Sulina

== Vaslui County ==
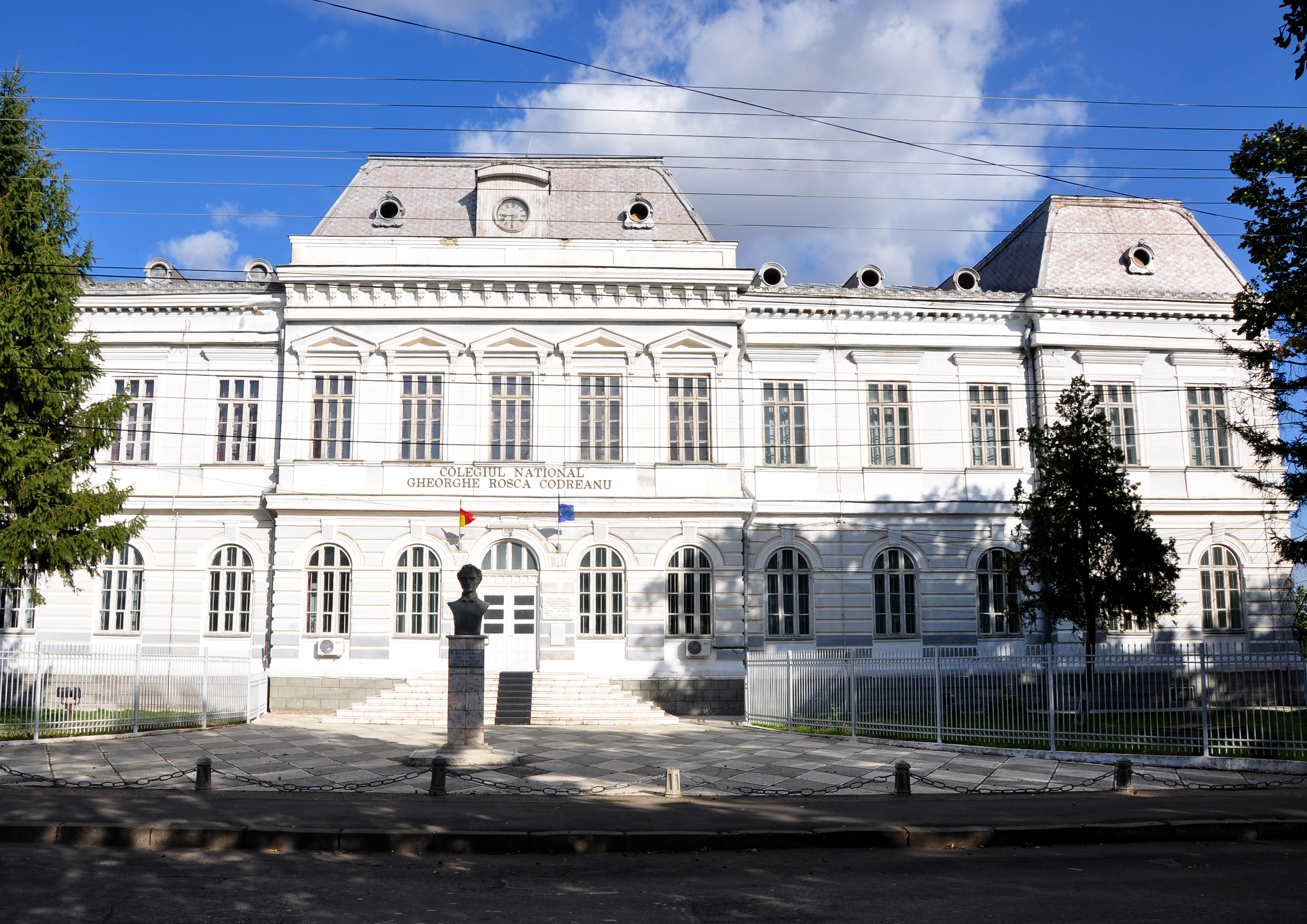
Gheorghe Roșca Codreanu National College, Bârlad

- Gheorghe Roșca Codreanu National College, Bârlad
- Mihai Eminescu Theoretical High School, Bârlad
- Ioan Popescu Pedagogical High School, Bârlad
- Ștefan cel Mare Technological High School, Codăești
- Cuza Vodă National College, Huși
- Ioan Corivan Technological High School, Huși
- Nicolae Iorga Technological High School, Negrești
- Puiești Technological High School
- Emil Racoviță Theoretical High School, Vaslui
- Mihail Kogălniceanu High School, Vaslui
- Ion Mincu Technological High School, Vaslui

== Vâlcea County ==
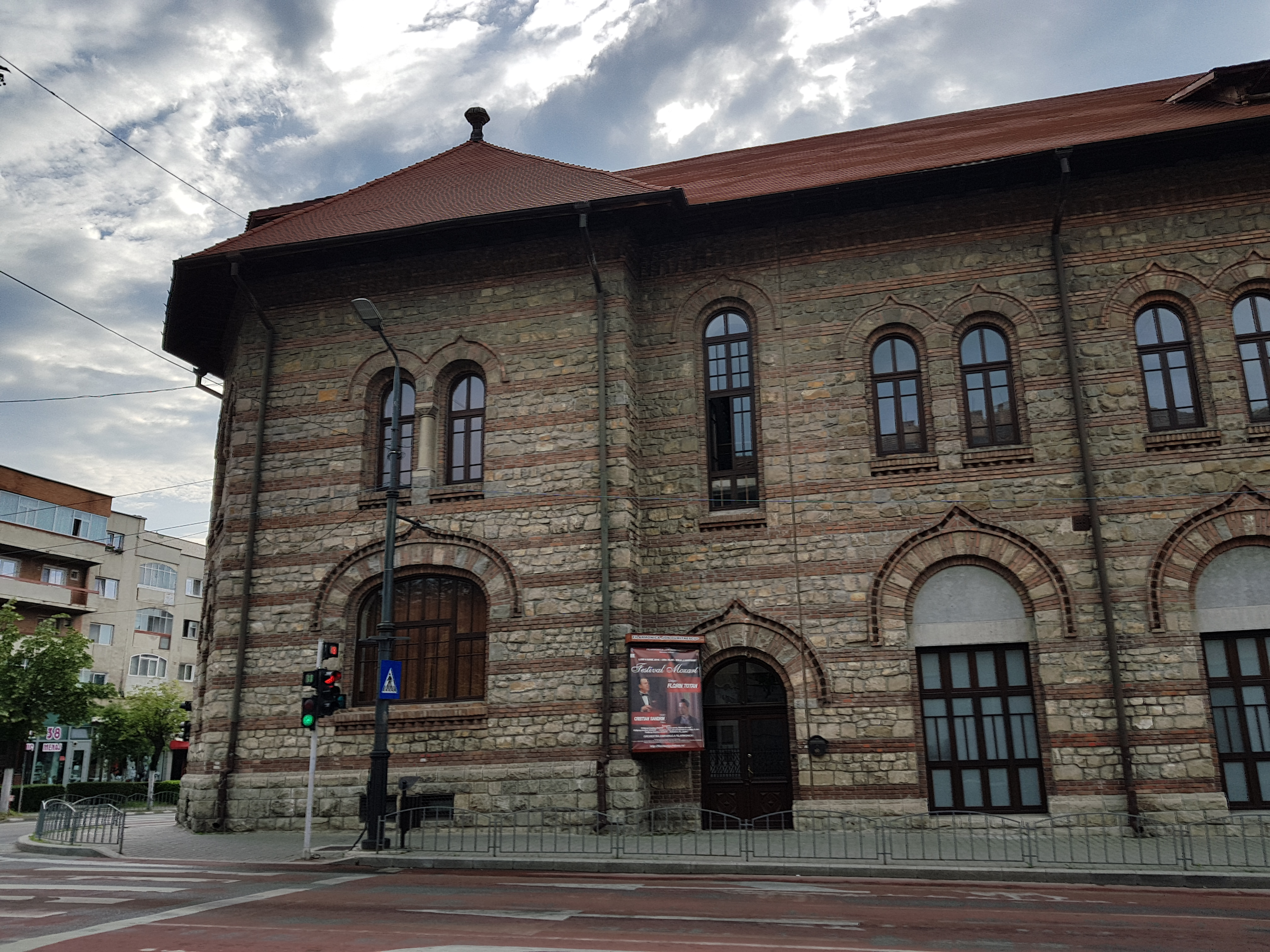
Alexandru Lahovari National College, Râmnicu-Vâlcea

- Alexandru Lahovari National College, Râmnicu-Vâlcea
- Mircea cel Bătrân National College (Râmnicu Vâlcea)
- Matei Basarab Informatics National College, Râmnicu-Vâlcea
- Ferdinand I Technological High School, Râmnicu-Vâlcea
- Râmnicu-Vâlcea Economic College
- Râmnicu-Vâlcea Energy College
- Râmnicu-Vâlcea Forestry High School
- George Tarnea High School, Băbeni
- Petrache Poenaru Technological High School, Bălcești
- Preda Buzescu High School, Berbești
- Gheorghe Surdu Theoretical High School, Brezoi
- Călimănești Tourism High School
- Gib Mihăescu National College, Drăgășani
- Brătianu Technological High School, Drăgășani
- Grădiștea Theoretical High School
- Constantin Brâncoveanu High School, Horezu
- Virgil Ierunca Theoretical High School, Lădești
- Măciuca Theoretical High School

== Vrancea County ==
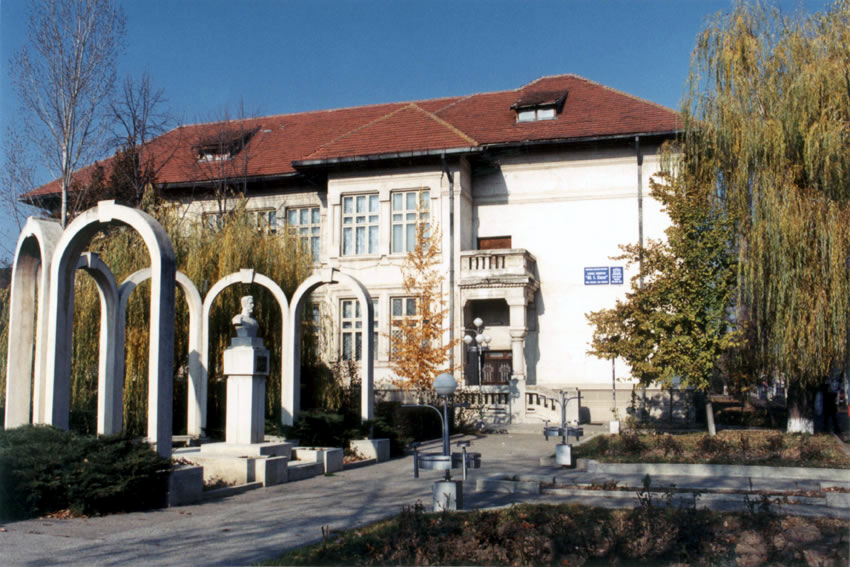
Alexandru Ioan Cuza National College, Focșani

- Alexandru Ioan Cuza National College (Focșani)
- Unirea National College (Focșani)
- Ion Mincu Technical High School, Focșani
- Valeriu D. Cotea Technical College, Focșani
- Edmond Nicolau Technical College, Focșani
- Emil Botta National College, Adjud
- Gheorghe Balș Technical College, Adjud
- Duiliu Zamfirescu Theoretical High School, Odobești
- Odobești Technological High School
- Alexandru I. Cuza Technological High School, Panciu
