= Unirea National College (Brașov) =

Unirea National College Brașov
- Colegiul Național Unirea

Location
- Bulevardul Eroilor, Nr. 7 Brașov, Brașov County, Romania 500007
- Coordinates: 45.64406°N 25.59621°E

Information
- School type: Public, magnet
- Motto: Ama sapientiam
- Founded: 1897
- Principal: Gabriela Hurghiș
- Grades: 5–12
- Language: Romanian
- Website: cnunirea.ro

Unirea National College (Romanian: Colegiul Național Unirea) is a magnet school located at 7 Eroilor Boulevard, Brașov, Romania. It hosts gymnasium (grades 5–8) and high school (grades 9–12) classes.

== History ==
- 1883 – The land required for the construction of the school has been bought.
- 1897 – The building was finished and the school was officially founded. It had two separate buildings – one for boys and one for girls. The two were joined by the gymnastics room forming a U-shaped building.
- 1898–1899 – The first generation of students have joined the girls' school. It had 227 students that were studying in Hungarian.
- 1914–1918 – The school's building hosted a military hospital and a prisoner's camp.
- 1918, December 1 – The Union of Transylvania with Romania was proclaimed; soon after, the school became a girls' high school.
- 1919, October 6 – The school had 8 classes (4 of primary education, and 4 of secondary education).
- 1922 – The school was renamed "Princess Elena" High School.
- 1928-1935 – High school had 8 classes instead of 4.
- 1934 – One more story was added to the building.
- 1941 – In the summer a hospital of the Romanian army was hosted in the school's building.
- 1941–1948 – The school's classes were held at other high schools as the building was still a hospital.
- 1948 – The school was renamed "Girls' High School"
- 1956 – Boys and girls studied in this same school that was renamed "Medium Mix School #5 Brașov".
- 1959 – The school was renamed "Unirea" (English: Union) after the historical event of the Unification of Moldavia and Wallachia. The school united with the Hungarian High School.
- 1990 – The union with the Hungarian High School ended.
- 2005 – The school started hosting gymnasium classes (5–8) that had as a main objective the intensive learning of foreign languages.Like French language, Spanish language, English language and more
- 2004 – "Unirea" was awarded the title of "European School".
- 2007 – The title of "European School" was renewed. The students of bilingual French classes could have a French school-leaving examination.
