= Decebal High School =

- Liceul Teoretic "Decebal" Constanța

Location
- Aleea Agarici Horia, Nr. 4 Constanța, Constanța County; Romania
- Coordinates: 44.21125°N 28.62730°E

Information
- Type: Public
- Motto: Discendo Vincimus
- Established: 1970; 56 years ago
- Founder: Nicolae Checiu
- Headmaster: Cornelia Șerban
- Website: liceulteoreticdecebal-ct.ro

Decebal High School (Romanian: Liceul Teoretic "Decebal" Constanța) is a high school located at 4 Agarici Horia Alley in Constanța, Romania.

== History ==
Decebal High School was established in 1970, as High School No. 5 of Constanța, due to a large number of schoolchildren in the area and the lack of a STEM-profiled high school.

In 1990, taking account the preferences of secondary school graduates but also the collective capacity of teachers, the school changed back to its former profile, under the name "Decebal" High School Constanța. After taking over "Dimitrie Știubei" School and "Flipper" Kindergarten in 2010, the Decebal High School educates over 1,000 students, aged 3–19.

== Alumni ==
- Gheorghe Hagi
