= Áprily Lajos National College =

State school in Brașov, Romania

Áprily Lajos High School
- Áprily Lajos Főgimnázium; Colegiul Național "Áprily Lajos"
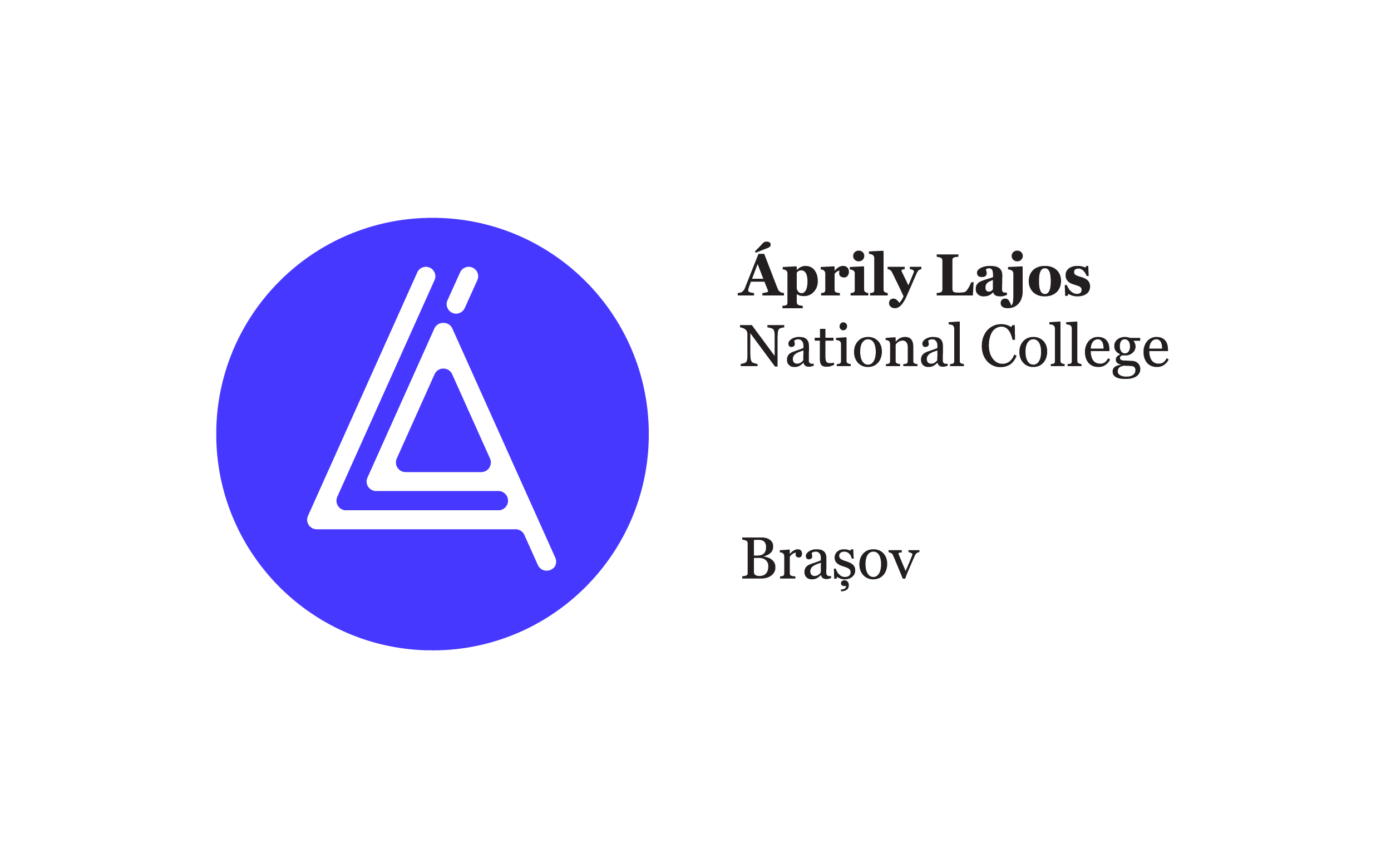

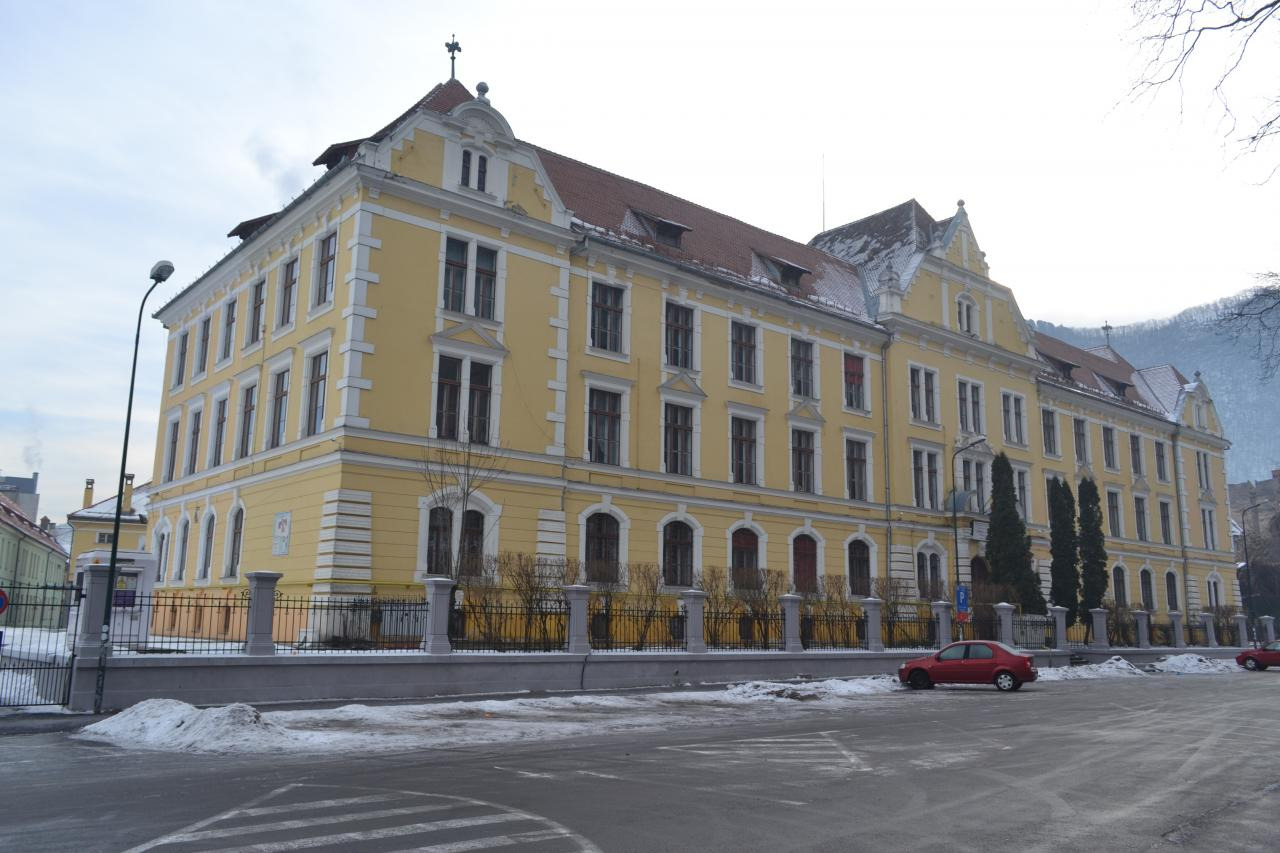

Location
- Strada După Ziduri, nr. 3 Brașov, Brașov County 500026; Romania
- 45.6446°N 25.5879°E

Information
- Founded: 1837; 189 years ago
- Founder: Antal Kovács
- Director: Irma Ferencz
- Age: 5 to 19
- Average class size: 25
- Hours in school day: 5–8
- Song: Áprily Induló
- Newspaper: Visszhang
- Tuition: free
- Website: www.aprilyfogimnazium.ro

Áprily Lajos High School (Romanian: Colegiul Național "Áprily Lajos"; Hungarian: Áprily Lajos Főgimnázium) is a Romanian state school located at 4 După Ziduri Street in Centrul Vechi, a neighborhood of Brașov, Romania. The school educates children aged between 5 (grade 0) and 19 years old (grade 12). Named after Hungarian poet Lajos Áprily, the school is the only Hungarian-language high school in Brașov.

Since its founding as a Roman Catholic gymnasium in 1837, the school has hosted a number of significant Romanian and Hungarian personalities as both students and teachers. Important names include Herrmann Antal, Bakó Árpád, and Andrei Mureșanu.
