= Callatis High School =

High school in Mangalia, Romania

- Romanian: Liceul Teoretic Callatis

Location
- 42 Rozelor Street; Mangalia; Romania; 43.82438°N 28.58429°E

Information
- Established: 1959; 67 years ago
- Principal: Daniela Diaconu
- Language: Romanian
- Website: callatis.ro

Callatis High School (Romanian: Liceul Teoretic "Callatis") is a high school located at 42 Rozelor Street, Mangalia, Romania.

== History ==
The school was founded in 1959 under the name Mixed Middle School, with grades from the 9th to the 12th. In 1965, its name was changed to the Theoretical High School with grades 1 to 12. Although in 1977, when the communist regime favoured technical education and the school was transformed into The Industrial High School No. 2, the theoretical education never stopped in Mangalia as there were classes with this profile functioning in the new high school.

In 1990, there was the opportunity for The Industrial High School No. 2 to get back its name and structure. Still, the Teachers’ Council decided to transform it into an economic school due to the tourist potential of the town. The same year, at the urging of the School General Inspector, Gheorghe Andrei and the Minister of National Education, the Government approved the reopening of the Theoretical High School. The High school functioned for eight years in a dormitory of the Ion Bănescu Industrial High School, and in 1998, a new building became the headquarters at 36 Rozelor Street.

At the same time the school changed its name into Callatis Theoretical High School, and the inauguration took place in the presence of Andrei Marga, Minister of National Education, the General Inspector from Constanța County Inspectorate, Gheorghe Andrei and other personalities of the time. The construction of the school was completed in 2000 (the new wing), and the construction of the gymnasium in 2004.

Until 1998, there were only high school classes, sciences and humanities profiles. Starting with 1999, primary classes were introduced, and starting with 2000 secondary classes, too, two for each grade level.

== Events ==
Callatis Theoretical High School has had the honour of hosting important events including:

- National Olympiad of Social and Human Sciences – 2005
- The Balkan Conference of Mathematical Sciences – 2007
- The National Mathematics Olympiad – 2009
- The Conference of the National Federation of the Parents’ Association – Pre-university Education – 2009
