= List of schools in Timișoara =

This is a list of schools in Timișoara, Romania.

== Primary and secondary schools ==
=== State-run ===
Timișoara has a series of primary and secondary schools, numbered from 1 to 30.

=== Private ===
- Ed Vertigo Primary School
- House of Hope Primary School
- Rudolf Walther Secondary School

== Colleges and high schools ==
=== State-run ===
- Ana Aslan National College
- Banat National College
- Carmen Sylva National Pedagogical College
- Constantin Diaconovici Loga National College
- Emanuil Ungureanu Technical College
- Francesco Saverio Nitti Economic College
- Henri Coandă Technical College
- Ion Vidu National College of Art
- Béla Bartók Theoretical High School (Hungarian)
- Dositej Obradović Theoretical High School (Serbian)
- Grigore Moisil Theoretical High School
- Jean-Louis Calderon Theoretical High School (French, Italian, Spanish)
- Nikolaus Lenau Theoretical High School (German)
- Vlad Țepeș Theoretical High School
- William Shakespeare Theoretical High School (English)
- Baptist Theological High School
- Gerhardinum Roman Catholic Theological High School
- Logos Pentecostal Theological High School
- St. Anthim the Iberian Orthodox Theological High School
- Automotive Transport Technological High School
- Azur Technological High School
- Banat High School with Sports Program
- Casa Verde Technological High School of Forestry and Agriculture
- Electrotimiș Technological High School
- High School of Fine Arts
- Ion I. C. Brătianu Technological High School
- King Ferdinand I Energy Technological High School
- Technological High School of Food Industry
- West Technological High School

=== Private ===
- Babel Theoretical High School
- Henri Coandă Theoretical High School
- Millennium Theoretical High School
- Montessori High School
- Socrates Theoretical High School
- Ioan Slavici Technological High School
- Spiru Haret UCECOM Technological High School
- British International School
- Waldorf High School
- Wendy School

=== Special high schools and education centers ===
- Gheorghe Atanasiu Special Technological High School
- Iris Special Theoretical High School
- Constantin Pufan School Center for Inclusive Education
- Dumitru Ciumăgeanu School Center for Inclusive Education
- Paul Popescu-Neveanu School Center for Inclusive Education
- Speranța Educational Resources and Assistance Center
- Timiș County Center for Educational Resources and Assistance
- Timiș County Center for Psychopedagogical Assistance
- Timiș Interschool Speech Therapy Center

== Universities ==
=== State-run ===
- King Michael I University of Life Sciences
- Polytechnic University
- Victor Babeș University of Medicine and Pharmacy
- West University

=== Private ===
- Ioan Slavici University
- Tibiscus University

== See also ==
- List of secondary schools in Romania
