= Atanasie Popovici =

Serbian Romanian schoolteacher, minority rights activist and irredentist

- Born: Atanasie Popovici Furnică (Атанасије Поповић Фурњика) c. 1887; Dušanovac (Geanova), Serbia
- Died: 14 November 1958 (aged 70–71); Timișoara, Romania
- Burial place: Calea Buziașului Cemetery, Timișoara
- Education: Saint Sava Serbian Orthodox Seminary; University of Jena
- Occupations: Schoolteacher, activist
- Known for: Campaigning for the minority rights of the Timok Romanians and the annexation of the Timok Valley by Romania

Atanasie Popovici Furnică (also Athanasie; c. 1887 – 14 November 1958; Serbian: Атанасије Поповић Фурњика, romanized: Atanasije Popović Furnjika) was a Romanian schoolteacher, minority rights activist and irredentist from Serbia. He was born in Dušanovac (Romanian: Geanova), a village in the then heavily Romanian-populated region of the Timok Valley (Valea Timocului) in Serbia. He established contact with multiple Romanian intellectual figures abroad while in the German Empire, most notably Onisifor Ghibu, who would collaborate extensively with him in future activities.

Popovici became intensely interested in the cause of the Timok Romanians, today known as the Vlachs of Serbia. He addressed Romania's Chamber of Deputies in 1912 with a memorandum on the situation of this group, generating much interest in the topic in Romania. From then on, he would write in multiple publications about the Timok Romanians, who lacked minority rights of their own and were subject to assimilation.

In 1918, in Chișinău, Romania (now Moldova), Popovici convened an assembly of Timok Romanians, which adopted a motion declaring the unification of the territories inhabited by Romanians in Serbia with Romania. In Chișinău was founded the National Committee of the Romanians of Serbia, of which Popovici was president. The committee engaged in propaganda activities in the Timok Valley, distributing the Chișinău motion in the region. Popovici was also part of the Romanian delegation at the Paris Peace Conference, addressing the conference in 1919 with his "Memorandum on the Romanians of Serbia", which gave a description of the Timok Romanians, denounced Serbianisation and called for the Timok Valley's outright annexation by Romania.

In the interwar period, Popovici was the director of the Pedagogical College of Timișoara and obtained a diplomatic post to manage the Romanian schools in the Yugoslav part of the Banat region. He took again a significant role in Timok Romanian matters during World War II, being offered to lead the Romanian government-initiated Timokian Committee and even conduct Romanian troops that were to occupy the Timok Valley, both of which he refused. After the war, Popovici lived in Timișoara until his death. In modern times, he has been revered in Romania as a greatly important figure in the history and cause of the Serbian Vlachs.

== Biography ==
=== Early life, education and life in Germany ===
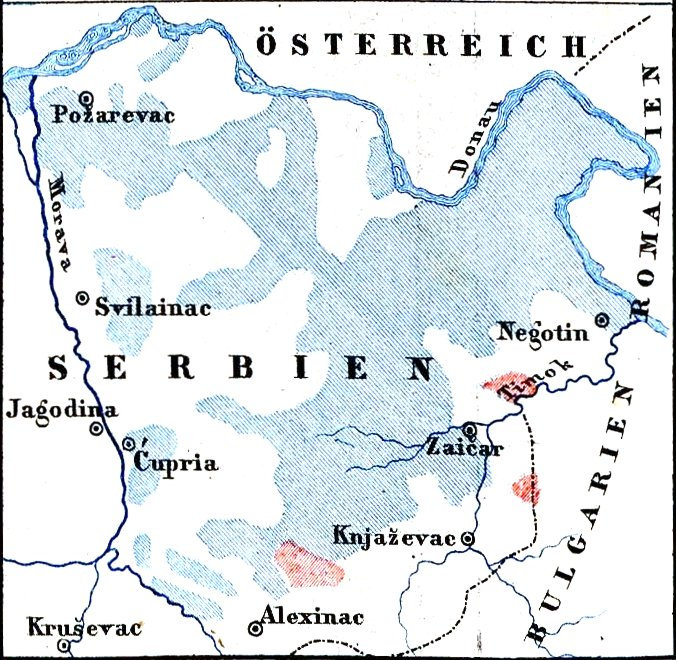
Ethnic map of the Timok Valley in Serbia by Felix Philipp Kanitz, showing Serbs (white), Romanians (blue) and Bulgarians (red). The map is based on the 1866 Serbian census.

Atanasie Popovici Furnică was born in the village of Dušanovac (Romanian: Geanova), near the town of Negotin (Negotin), in the then densely Romanian-populated region of the Timok Valley (Valea Timocului) in Serbia. He was born c. 1887; according to the legation of the Kingdom of Serbs, Croats and Slovenes (that is, Yugoslavia) in Paris, France, Popovici was 32 as of March 1919. Both of Popovici's parents were priests. His mother, Elena, was the one who took close care of the education of their children, while his father was named popa Furnică, who was a priest in Dušanovac after whom Popovici was known by his full name. Additionally, Popovici had family living in the villages of Jabukovac (Icubovăț) and Mihajlovac (Mihăilă or Meilovăț), also in the Timok Valley.

The Romanians from the Timok Valley were labelled as such in official documents and serious studies all throughout the 19th century and the beginning of the 20th century. The Vlachs of Serbia, as the Timok Romanians are known today, started being named as such after World War I, in parallel with a systemic campaign to deny their connection with Romanians and Romania; they were divided into "Romanians" and "Vlachs" for the first time in the 1948 Yugoslav census. Furthermore, they lacked education in their native Romanian language and ended up heavily assimilated, resulting in almost no demands from their part for minority rights of their own.

Popovici completed primary school in his native village. He then took his secondary studies at the Saint Sava Serbian Orthodox Seminary in Belgrade in Serbia, an institution with a recognized reputation where he then also studied theology. Popovici then studied pedagogy and philosophy at the University of Jena, in the German Empire. At this university, he wrote his doctoral thesis on pedagogy, on the topic of Pedagogia experimentală ("Experimental Pedagogy"). He also established a private experimental school in Jena for a time.

While studying in Germany, Popovici came into contact with young Romanian students, be they from within the Kingdom of Romania's borders or from the regions of Banat and Transylvania then in Austria-Hungary. He joined cultural organizations of the Romanians and Aromanians. Popovici met in Germany the future Romanian academic and politician Onisifor Ghibu, with whom he became friends. He considered him a close associate especially regarding the issue of the Romanians outside Romania's borders. Timok Romanian writer, historian and folklorist Cristea Sandu Timoc defined Ghibu as Popovici's most valued colleague. According to Romanian professor Gheorghe Rancu Bodrog, starting from 1908, and having been inspired by Ghibu, Popovici committed himself to fighting for the rights of the Romanians of the Timok Valley; this would thus have become his life ideal. In this regard, he began meetings with Romanian students, with whom he had useful exchanges of ideas.

Popovici left for Romania in 1911, where he stayed only for a short time realizing his then lack of a fully correct command of the Romanian language. After obtaining his doctorate, he was urged by his friends to try obtain a teaching post in Sibiu in Austria-Hungary (now Romania), which proved unsuccessful. Popovici then returned to Germany for a time, further developing closer ties with Romanian intellectuals abroad, including figures like scholar, writer and politician Nicolae Iorga and mathematician, astronomer and politician Spiru Haret, among others.

=== Early activities during the Balkan Wars and World War I ===
On 18 December 1912, Popovici addressed the Chamber of Deputies of Romania with a memorandum on the situation of the Timok Romanians, presented by Iorga on behalf of him. The memorandum was published in the Romanian newspaper Adevărul under the title Românii din Serbia apelează către Țară și Parlament ("The Romanians of Serbia Appeal to the Country and Parliament"), and it sought to elicit cultural support for the Romanians in eastern Serbia from the Romanian state. It generated assurances and promises to Popovici from Romanian forums in Bucharest on help for the Timok Romanians, with the Romanian press of the time supporting Popovici's efforts and recommending the authorities in Bucharest to fund his activities. Multiple articles from Bucharest newspapers addressing the precarious situation of the Romanians in the Timok Valley accompanied the memorandum. Ultimately however, as Rancu Bodrog described it, the received assurances and promises ended up being all empty talk.

In the memorandum, Popovici stated that the Serbian bishop of the Eparchy of Timok had ordered the eparchy's priests on 12 August 1899 to baptize children with purely Serb names, following a guide he himself had drawn up. This would have begun the Serbianisation of the names of the Timok Romanian families, something carried out in parallel by schools and the authorities as he stated. Popovici claimed that there were 83 Romanian villages in the Timok Valley in Serbia, 72 of which reportedly did not have a single Serb family living in them. The memorandum warned that the Romanian language was in continuous decline in the region, while Serb culture was imposing itself in every way. The memorandum ends with an appeal for help from Romania: "We do not ask for money, we do not want land, but we claim our right to national spiritual nourishment. We, those who know what national culture means, feel its absence most painfully. I learned to read and write Romanian in Germany."

Upon heading again back to Germany, being wanted by Serbian security services as he was considered a deserter, Popovici got married in Germany shortly afterwards, with one of the daughters of his experimental pedagogy professor. In 1913, from Jena, through a series of letters, Popovici advised Romania not to enter into war against Bulgaria in the context of the Second Balkan War, but against Serbia instead, to liberate the Romanians of the Timok Valley. Popovici's enthusiasm was somewhat extinguished by the Treaty of Bucharest which concluded the Second Balkan War in the summer of 1913 and the outbreak of World War I in the summer of the following year. At the beginning of the war, Popovici settled in Silistra in Southern Dobruja, Romania (now in Bulgaria), with the help of Ghibu. He became a teacher of German at the Romanian high school in the town, publishing in several magazines about the Timok Romanians in the meantime. He moved to Bucharest in 1916, where he published several articles calling for the Timok Valley's unification with Romania, and after the capital city was occupied, he withdrew to Western Moldavia. In the context of only occasional interest in the situation of the Romanians south of the Danube by the Romanian press at the time, Popovici wrote another memorandum, a well-documented one, on their situation and published it in the magazine Românismul.

=== End of World War I and Timok Romanian committee ===
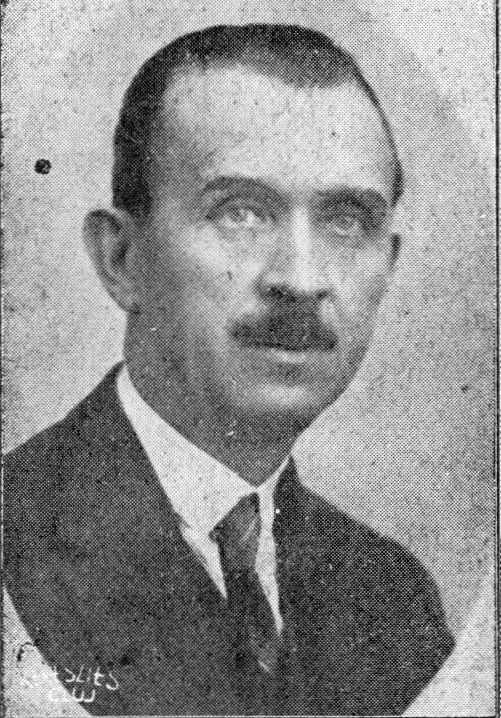
Romanian academic and politician Onisifor Ghibu, a life-long friend of Popovici, in 1934. Ghibu was involved and collaborated with Popovici in many of his activities throughout his life.

The end of World War I and the Romanian Great Union of December 1918 caught Popovici in Chișinău, Romania (now in Moldova); he continued to campaign for the unification of the Timok Valley with Romania throughout this time. In the city, he published articles in support of the rights of the Timok Romanians in Ardealul în Basarabia and Coala Moldovenească, magazines founded by his friend Ghibu. He published Le Roumanie de Serbie in French, addressing not only the Romanian government refuged in Iași but also representatives of the great powers. He was on the editorial committee of the Chișinău newspaper România Nouă as of 24 January 1918, the day the newspaper's first issue appeared, along with other figures, namely Vladimir Cazacliu, Ghibu, Vasile Harea, Ion Matei, Dumitru Munteanu-Râmnic, Constantin Noe and George Tofan. Popovici signed the union declaration published in that first issue, which stated at its end that "everyone must realize that our salvation is only in a new Romania of all Romanians", for the realization of which the declaration and its signatories proclaimed they would work, live and, if necessary, die. Popovici also exercised as president of the Great National Assembly of the Romanians from Everywhere, which on 1 December 1918 held a great assembly in Chișinău simultaneously with the Great National Assembly of Alba Iulia which declared the Great Union.

In Chișinău, Popovici convened an assembly of Timok Romanians, during which a motion was adopted declaring the unification of the Romanian-inhabited territories in Serbia with Romania. The motion was written by Popovici, who proposed the creation of an organization for the liberation and unification of all the Romanians in the Timok Valley. Published on 1 November 1918 in the city, it was signed by Popovici, Liviu Bogdan, Sever Coteț and Ion Niță. The latter three were, respectively, a civil servant and two military sub-officers; all signatories were from the Timok Valley. The authors expressed their confidence that their request for annexation by Romania would be accepted by the upcoming Paris Peace Conference. The motion's conclusion showcases great enthusiasm: "Hurray! Long live the Romanians of Serbia united with Romania! Long live the Greater Romania of all Romanians!". Censorship at the time prevented its publication at România Nouă, but it was distributed through leaflets nonetheless. A copy of the motion exists at the State Archives of Serbia in Belgrade. The motion was to be disseminated throughout Transylvania, Banat and the Timok Valley. A committee of the Timok Romanians, named the National Committee of the Romanians of Serbia, was formed in Chișinău with this purpose, being led by Popovici as well as Ghibu, Romanian journalist and politician Pan Halippa and other figures; it was to also draft a memorandum for the conference in Paris requesting the union of not only Banat but also the Timok Valley with Romania. Members of this committee addressed the French minister plenipotentiary in Bucharest and expressed to him their desire to unite with Romania.

Stevan Hadžić, the Yugoslav military attaché in Romania, spoke in early 1919 of a "systematic agitation" by Romania against Yugoslav interests in Banat and the Timok Valley, regions which he said Romania was seeking to annex; he referred to the members of the committee as "agitators". In the first months of the year, the Yugoslav legation in Bucharest sent several reports to the government in Belgrade describing Romanian propaganda intended for the Timok Valley. In this regard stood out Đorđe Nastasijević, the chargé d'affaires of the legation, who focused especially on the Timok area. According to Nastasijević, Popovici was regarded as the most fervent Romanian agent at that time; he would have taken such role following the motion adopted in Chișinău as he considered. According to Romanian Serb historian Miodrag Milin and Romanian researcher Bogdan Cătană, Nastasijević had a sort of "obsession" with keeping Popovici under observation and denigrating him. This would have continued even after the partition of Banat and the demarcation of the new Romanian–Yugoslav border in the region in June that year.

According to Nastasijević, Popovici's committee moved from Chișinău to Sibiu, from where agents were sent to the Timok area, and then in the first half of January 1919 from Sibiu to Turnu Severin, on the border with Yugoslavia. From here, Popovici would have gone to Yugoslavia, to Jabukovac and Mihajlovac. Nastasijević stated that Jabukovac and Mihajlovac were the villages where the most propaganda was carried out; he advised the Yugoslav government to be cautious with Popovici's family members in these two villages. He described George Popovici, who fled to Turnu Severin, and Alexie Popovici in Kladovo (Cladova) as among the leaders of this "movement" in the Timok Valley, with Iovan Kazimirovici being the chief in Jabukovac. He also proposed that any person crossing into Kladovo from Romania be checked to prevent any movement from these figures. Nastasijević stated that, while in Jabukovac and Mihajlovac, Popovici had distributed again the Chișinău motion, in Romanian this time written in the Cyrillic script; he would later speak in a June 1919 telegram of a reprint of the motion printed "a few weeks earlier" in Turnu Severin, in Cyrillic as the Timok Romanians did not know the Latin script. This Cyrillic version was written using characters from the Serbian Cyrillic alphabet, and featured the same signatories, comprising eight pages. According to Nastasijević, the intention with this motion was to distribute it in every village in the Timok area, with the aim of creating a committee linked to the one in Romania. A center for such activities existed in the village of Korbovo (Corbova) as he stated. A copy of this version was sent to the Yugoslav delegation in Paris. According to Milin and Cătană, it is possible that this Cyrillic version was an invention by Nastasijević, citing his purported increasing obsession with Popovici's actions especially and with the activities related to the Timok Romanians.

In a January 1919 telegram, Nastasijević stated that Popovici had been closely followed for the last five months and that he was in contact with Nastasijević's people in Yugoslavia at that time. Stojan Protić, then the Prime Minister of Yugoslavia, requested Nastasijević to follow Popovici and inform him about his activities, as they could harm what he described as the good relations between Romania and Yugoslavia. He also asked Nastasijević to attempt by any means to keep the committee's activity as far away from the Yugoslav border as possible. Later, at a meeting in early February, Ion I. C. Brătianu, then Prime Minister of Romania, declared to Nastasijević that, while Romania had no intention of annexing the Timok Valley, the activities of the committee of the Timok Romanians present in Romanian territory were internal matters of the Romanian state, in which Yugoslavia had no right to interfere. Brătianu had already discussed with Nastasijević two months earlier about Popovici's activities in Chișinău, with him stating the Romanian government had nothing to do with Popovici. Protić was unsatisfied by Brătianu's response to Nastasijević at the February 1919 meeting, considering that it was Romania that was meddling in Yugoslavia's internal affairs through a committee plotting against Yugoslav interests at the country's border. Yugoslavia believed that Popovici worked under the command of the Romanian government all throughout as shown by an October 1919 telegram from Nastasijević. Popovici's committee would eventually relocate further inland in Romania following protests to the Romanian government from the Yugoslav legation in Bucharest. According to Milin and Cătană, Popovici's activities were most likely not nearly as complex and subversive towards Serbia and Yugoslavia as Nastasijević described them.

=== 1919 Paris Peace Conference ===
In Paris, Popovici was vice president of the League for the Liberation of the Romanians of Timok and Macedonia, carrying out intense propagandistic activity in support of Romanian national ideals, focusing on those of the Timok Romanians. The league had been founded on 8 March 1918 in Paris, with Aromanian writer, professor and scholar George Murnu as president and Popovici, Romanian politician, economist and journalist Sever Bocu from Banat and Aromanian delegate N. Tacit as vice presidents. Popovici was also part of the Romanian delegation at the Paris Peace Conference in 1919 as a counselor. The delegation, made up of 20 people, was led by Romanian general Constantin Prezan. As Brătianu wanted to have the Timok Valley discussed in Paris, he himself invited Popovici. Popovici thus went to Paris on 10 March 1919 as delegate of the Timok Romanians. He had previously gotten a request to have his passport stamped rejected by Nastasijević, as the Romanian delegation to Paris intended to pass through Yugoslavia to reach the city. The reason he gave was that Popovici was a Yugoslav subject who had denigrated the interests of Yugoslavia, with Nastasijević warning the Yugoslav government not to allow his entry into the country without a visa. Once in Paris, Popovici wrote multiple articles in the local newspaper Le Temps about the Timok Romanians, with the aim of attracting sympathy from the French public to the annexation of the Timok Valley by Romania.

As president of the National Committee of the Romanians of Serbia and on behalf of the League for the Liberation of the Romanians of Timok and Macedonia, Popovici addressed the conference with the memorandum Memoire sur les Roumains des Serbie ("Memorandum on the Romanians of Serbia"). It was written in French, and was published with support from the Italian and Japanese delegations at the conference on 20 March 1919, on the Paris newspaper La Roumanie. The memorandum provides a picture on the historical, geographical and demographic conditions of the Timok Romanians at the time, including information on their origin, age and continuity in the area. It invokes Wilsonian principles and the right to self-determination. The memorandum openly calls for Romania's annexation of the Timok Valley: "We demand from the Peace Conference, on the basis of Wilson's principles, the right to be annexed to our free brothers in the Kingdom [of Romania]". In response, Pašić argued, rejecting such idea as impossible, that as "Serbian ships sail on the Morava", for strategic reasons, it was not convenient for the opposite bank of the river to be Romanian territory.

The memorandum affirms the antiquity of the Romanians in the Timok area, giving a population of 340,000 Timok Romanians at that time; the Chișinău motion had given a figure of 500,000 Romanians in Serbia. The memorandum presents the Timok Romanians as the descendants of a mixture of Roman settlers and Romanized Thracians, only partially Slavicised during the Slavic migrations to the Balkans, as they would have been sheltered "in the high valleys and dense forests of this mountainous region". This argument of autochthonousness and continuity would be confirmed by several official acts from 14th-century Serbian kings mentioning the community. The Timok Romanians would have then been reinforced by subsequent migration waves, firstly by "Macedo-Romanian elements from the Pindus and the Balkans" and secondly by settlers from Banat and Oltenia. The geographical area described by the memorandum is limited by the Timok (Timoc) river to the east, the Danube river to the north, the Great Morava (Morava Mare) river to the west and the Rtanj (Râtani) mountains to the south.

In the memorandum, Popovici blames the Serbian authorities for what he called the Serbianisation of the Timok Romanians, stating that the proportion of Romanians in eastern Serbia was decreasing while at the same time the population in their settlements was not, as more and more of them declared themselves to be Serbs instead. He accused the Serbian government of excluding the Romanian language from churches and schools in the region and reproached the Romanian government for doing nothing to help the Timok Romanians. Popovici stated that the Serbian state and church authorities had "banned" education and church services in Romanian, referring to alleged cases of harassment of priests and teachers who expressed Romanian affiliation and even claiming that Romania had to prevent an uprising against the Serbian authorities due to the scale of this harassment. He states that the Timok Romanians had written three times to the Romanian authorities, in 1904, 1906 and 1913, asking them to advocate to the Serbian authorities the opening of Romanian schools and the establishment of a Romanian church structure; Popovici claims that the Romanian authorities refused to maintain good relations with Serbia. According to him, unlike other minorities in the country, the Romanians from eastern Serbia were the only who had fought in all the wars for the independence and sovereignty of Serbia, and yet they were the only minority in the country at the time who were not recognized as such with their own full minority rights protected by the law.

Serbian ethnologist, historian and professor Tihomir Đorđević, who was a member of the Yugoslav delegation, responded to Popovici's memorandum with his La vérité sur les Roumains de Serbie ("The Truth About the Romanians of Serbia"). Đorđević attacked Popovici's call for the annexation of the Timok Valley by Romania and declared that "Romanians are well-treated and feel like free citizens" in the region. Đorđević supported the thesis of Romanian immigration to the area and argued that the studies on the Timok Romanians had been started by Austrian researchers to break the Romanian–Serbian friendship as he described it. He stated that the Serbian Romanians, whose number was said to be very small, had come to Serbia as refugees, described as "these miserable refugees" who "have learned from the Serbs how to build their houses". And Popovici was presented as "the only Romanian protester in Serbia"; the positions of the two were therefore completely opposite. Previously, in one of Popovici's articles at Le Temps, titled Despre românii din Timoc ("About the Romanians of Timok") and published on 28 February 1919, he had made references to Đorđević's book Kroz naše Rumune ("About Our Romanians").

According to Sandu Timoc, Popovici explained to him that his participation in the Paris Peace Conference had two phases. Initially, as the idea of the Romanian annexation of the Timok Valley was raised, he received attention from Romanian politicians, who promised him support. However, as Marie, the queen consort of Romania, intended to marry her daughter Maria to then Yugoslav prince Alexander I Karađorđević, attention from Romania ceased, with Popovici remaining with political support only from the Italian and Japanese delegations as he stated. As Milin and Cătană described it, starting from summer 1919, Romanian diplomacy officially quit supporting the ideas promoting the annexation of the Timok Valley to Romania. At this time, mutual Romanian–Yugoslav support in the face of revisionism from the Hungarian Soviet Republic was starting to develop, coupled with Marie's nuptial efforts which bore fruit in 1922 and were accompanied by campaigning from the queen for a greater rapprochement between both countries. Ultimately, Popovici's memorandum, as well as Đorđević's, failed to achieve their objectives, being disregarded in the discussions of the Commission for the Frontiers of Romania and Yugoslavia, as the great powers' representatives preferred to be guided by studies carried out by experts from their own diplomatic corps.

=== Interwar period and World War II ===
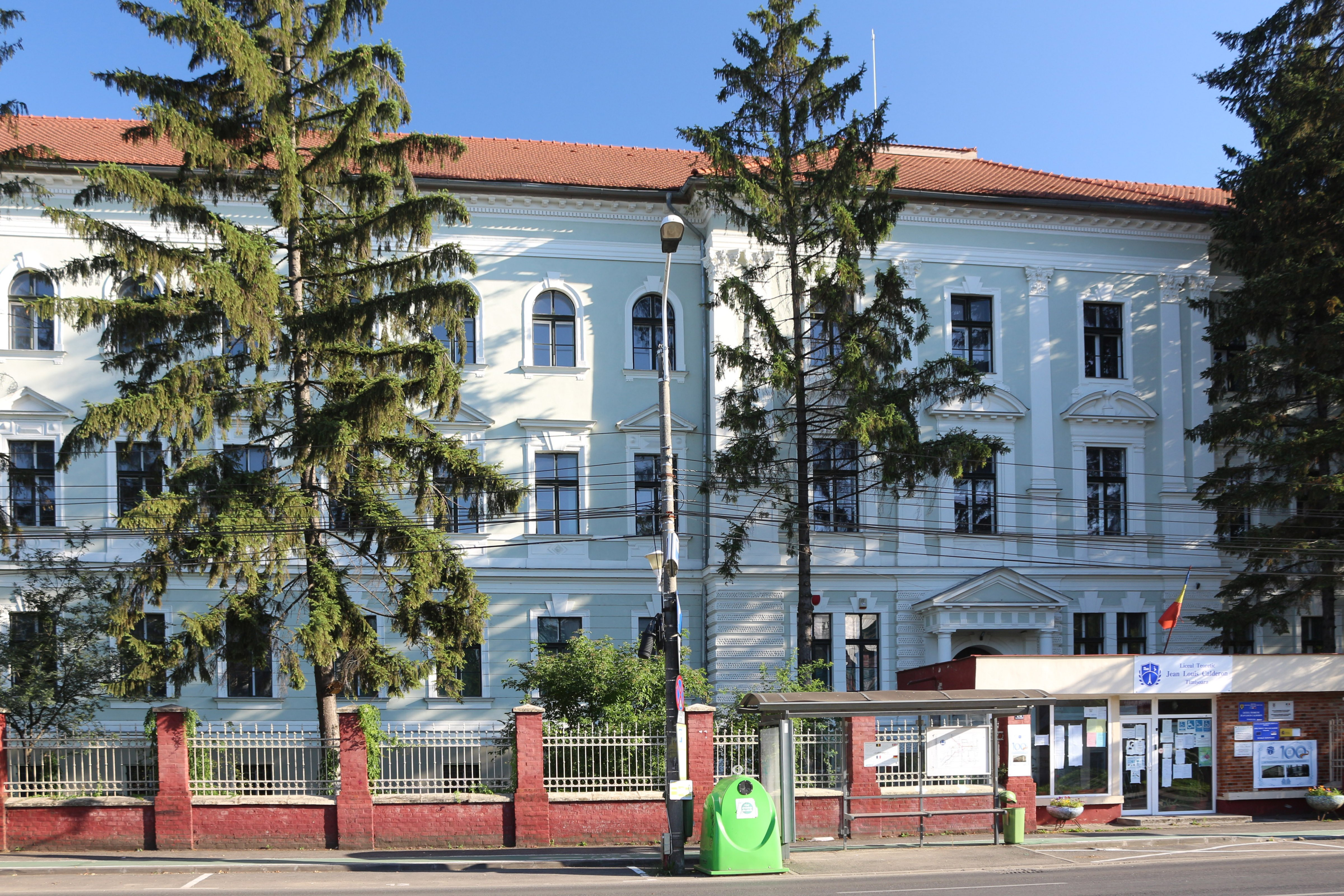
The Jean-Louis Calderon High School in Timișoara, Romania. Popovici was the high school's director from 1919 to 1937, when it was known as the Pedagogical College of Timișoara.

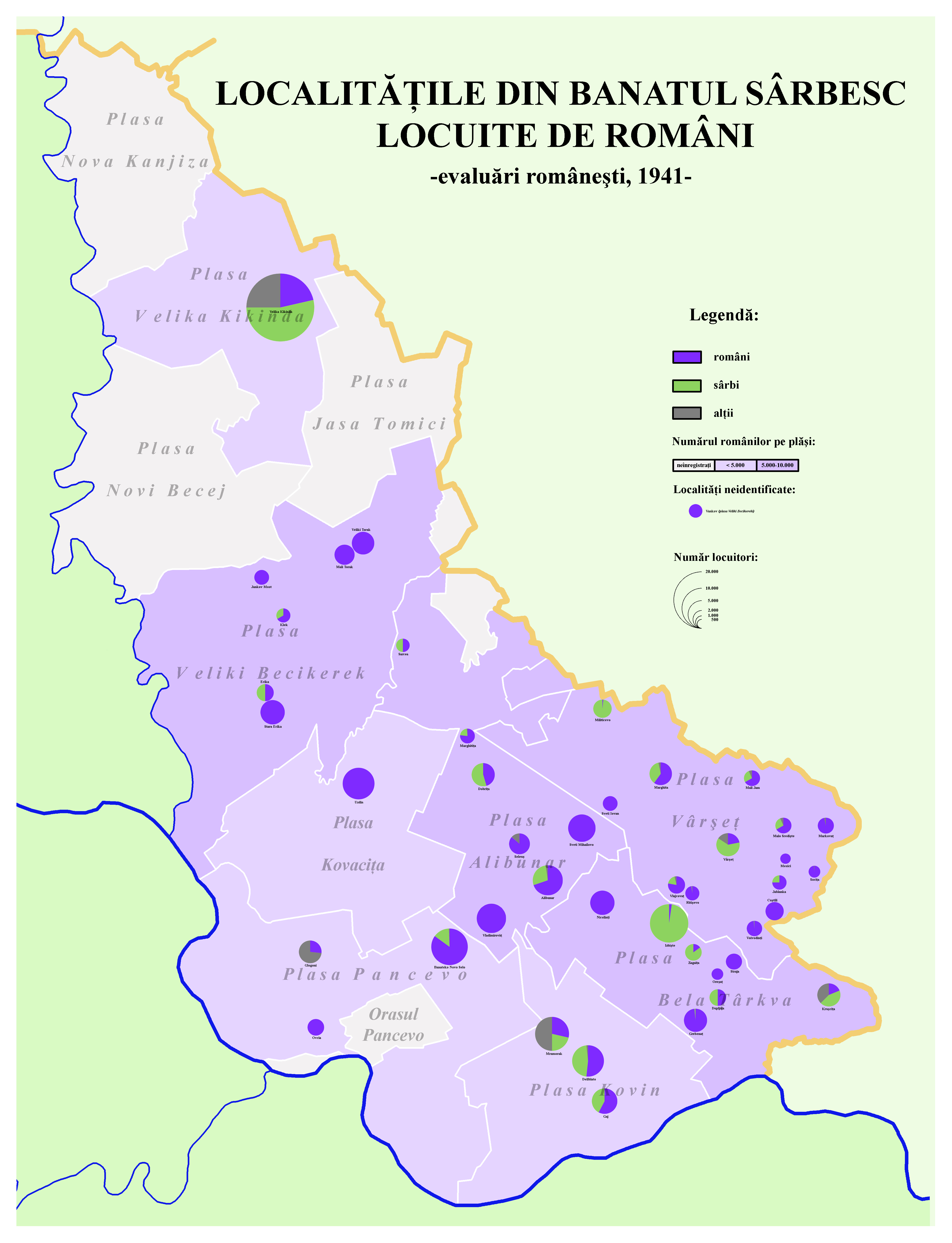
Map of the localities in western Banat with ethnic Romanian populations in 1941; Popovici had a role in the general management of their schools.

The Timok Romanians were ultimately not recognized as a minority in Yugoslavia during the Paris Peace Conference. Seeing that nothing could be achieved regarding the Timok Valley at the conference, Popovici returned to Romania, being in Bucharest as of October 1919. Popovici became the director of the Pedagogical College of Timișoara (now the Jean-Louis Calderon High School) on that year, when it was taken over by the Romanian state, being its first Romanian director. Leading the college until August 1937, Popovici was a protector of the intellectual youth from western Banat in Yugoslavia that emigrated to Romania, also bringing children from his native lands to instruct them into becoming teachers themselves. Under his leadership, an agricultural production farm was contracted to supply the boarding school and serve as an experimental space for the economic training of the students. He also strengthened ties between the college and pedagogical circles in Cluj, in particular with Ghibu. Popovici lived on 9 Ofcei Street in Timișoara during this time.

Popovici was part of a special commission of the Transylvanian Association for Romanian Literature and the Culture of the Romanian People (ASTRA) composed of 20 personalities of the association who were to deal with the necessary procedures for ASTRA's expansion into the region of Bessarabia. Such a commission for this purpose had first been proposed at a general meeting of ASTRA on 8–9 November 1924 in Arad. Furthermore, Popovici and Ghibu were part of a mixed Romanian–Yugoslav commission, headed by Romanian journalist and politician Valeriu Braniște as president of the Romanian side, which carried out negotiations in Belgrade to regulate the regime of the churches and schools of the Romanians and Serbs in Banat, divided between the two countries. With the commission having been formed during the government led by Romanian prime minister Take Ionescu (1921–1922), the negotiations were difficult and a convention on schools was only reached in March 1933, being ratified by both countries in 1935.

Afterward, on 1 August 1937, Popovici was named technical counselor at the Romanian embassy in Belgrade regarding the Romanian schools in western Banat. He had an office and a room with a bed on the first floor of the embassy's building. Popovici personally met Sandu Timoc in 1938, as the former was inspecting the Romanian High School and Romanian Pedagogical College of Vršac (Vârșeț). Sandu Timoc once asked Popovici why had he not requested the inclusion of the Timok Romanians in the aforementioned cultural convention, to which he replied by telling Sandu Timoc that he did not know the character of the Serbs and that for that reason he had illusions they would ever voluntarily grant rights to the Timok Romanians without force.

During World War II and the Axis occupation of Serbia, Popovici was one of the leading figures promoting the recognition of rights for the Timok Romanians together with Sandu Timoc and Timok Romanian priest Gheorghe I. Suveică (also Suveiche). The three of them requested help for the Timok Romanians to the highest level forums in Romania. Serbian historian and researcher Aleksandar Raković described Sandu Timoc and Suveică as the leaders of the Romanian irredentists in the Timok Valley during World War II. Popovici and Suveică, alongside Romanian poet, professor and journalist Constantin Miu Lerca and Pop Djoca Popovici, were featured as leader figures in an October 1941 list of several dozens of Timok Romanians recommended to the Nazi German occupation authorities in Serbia by Romania's Special Service of Intelligence (SSI) in the context of fear over potential Serbian acts of reprisal against them.

Popovici was offered to lead the Timokian Committee (Comitetul Timocean), which had been initiated on 18 November 1941 by the Romanian government to patronize all actions in support of the Romanians in occupied Yugoslavia. Being then organized in Turnu Severin and led by Suveică, with Sandu Timoc as the committee's cultural secretary, Popovici refused, arguing that he was too busy with the affairs of the schools he was in charge of and that this position could very well be filled by Sandu Timoc. This offer was made to Popovici without Suveică's knowledge; Rancu Bodrog argued that from this it could be deduced there were some disagreements between the three men. On 8 October that year had previously been founded at a meeting in the Union Hotel in Bucharest the Banatiano-Timokian Committee (Comitetul bănățeano-timocean), with Popovici and Suveică as representatives for the Romanians of the Timok Valley and Yugoslav Romanian lawyer and activist Alexandru Butoarcă and Romanian priest Adam Fiștea for those of western Banat; the committee included other consultative members as well. It was to have its central headquarters in Timișoara and centers in Turnu Severin and Vršac. Established with the endorsement of the Romanian government, which was represented at the foundational meeting by general secretary Ovidiu Vlădescu, the committee failed to unite the Yugoslav Romanians' leaders.

In his own memoirs, Ghibu, who was often involved in affairs related to the Timok Romanians, provides some information not confirmed by official sources. According to him, in the summer of 1942, Popovici arranged a meeting in Timișoara between Ghibu and the Romanian general Corneliu Dragalina. Dragalina would have told Ghibu that Ion Antonescu, the wartime dictator of Romania, had directly informed him in a telephone call that the Romanian Armed Forces would occupy the Timok Valley "in the next 24 hours". In a discussion between Ghibu and Popovici hours later, the latter expressed the idea that Nazi Germany "will not give us the Timok Valley out of simple brotherly love, but as a price for Northern Transylvania, if not for the whole of Transylvania, which it would more gladly give to its Hungarian friends...", with Popovici stating he did not want Romania to accept the Timok Valley as alms from Germany and much less so as compensation for Transylvania. According to Rancu Bodrog, Popovici was also proposed that summer to lead the Romanian troops that were to cross into the Timok Valley following an understanding between Antonescu and Nazi German leader Adolf Hitler. He refused, arguing, in what Rancu Bodrog considered as further proof of the existence of some discrepancies amongst the three figures in the interpretation of the Timok Romanians' problems, that he could not take such extraordinary responsibility with Suveică, who was no stranger to the understanding and who Popovici described as holding distant positions of moral superiority and as being uncapable of taking "any kind of responsibility upon himself".

=== Death and memory ===
Popovici lived in Timișoara during Romania's communist period until the end of his life. He died on 14 November 1958, in Timișoara, being buried in the city, at the Calea Buziașului Cemetery. According to Milin and Cătană, Popovici would remain in history as probably the best-known exponent of the struggle of the Timok Romanians for their national rights in the first half of the 20th century, alongside Sandu Timoc and Suveică; both researchers described Popovici's merits in their national struggle as the most resounding in the group's history, even if his activities were not met with success. Rancu Bodrog declared about Popovici that he "remains one of the fiercest fighters" for the rights of the Romanians in the Timok Valley and not only, with him having been in any circumstance "at the center of the centuries-old aspirations of the Timok Romanians", namely the preservation of their language and national identity by maintaining Romanian-language churches and schools. According to Vlach ethnologist Paun Es Durlić, Popovici has been presented by certain Romanian circles as the greatest historical figure of the Vlachs of Serbia in the 20th century.

During his stay in Paris as a counselor for the Romanian delegation, Popovici met Great National Assembly delegate Ioan Sârbu from Rudăria, leaving a good impression on him, with Sârbu later stating he had already heard of him as being "an ardent supporter of the rights of Romanians, especially those from Timok". Ghibu defined Popovici as "a perfect connoisseur of the question of the Timok Romanians, verified through his public activity of over three decades", highlighting that he managed to interest not only the Romanian public opinion but also the European one on the matters of the Timok Romanians. Ghibu also described him as "a man of the most perfect good faith, absolutely devoted and selfless, modest, correct, with a past and present clear as crystal". Sandu Timoc described Popovici as "one of the most enlightened figures of the Romanian nation", with Romanians from both the Timok Valley and western Banat being able to mention his name "with fame and joy, in any prayer". Romanian professor Mihai Nicolae referred to Popovici as "the most consequent fighter for identity rights" that the Timok Romanians had had, stating that "we owe him a statue and, at least, an objective article on Wikipedia".
