= Dušanovac =

Dušanovac may refer to:

- Dušanovac, Belgrade, an urban neighbourhood of Belgrade, Serbia
- Dušanovac, Negotin, a municipality of Negotin, Serbia
- Banatski Dušanovac, a former village in modern Serbia which merged with Zvarnjak and formed Banatski Dvor
- Dušanovo, a village in Kosovo formerly known as Dušanovac in Serbian
