= Jean-Louis Calderon High School =

Jean-Louis Calderon Theoretical High School
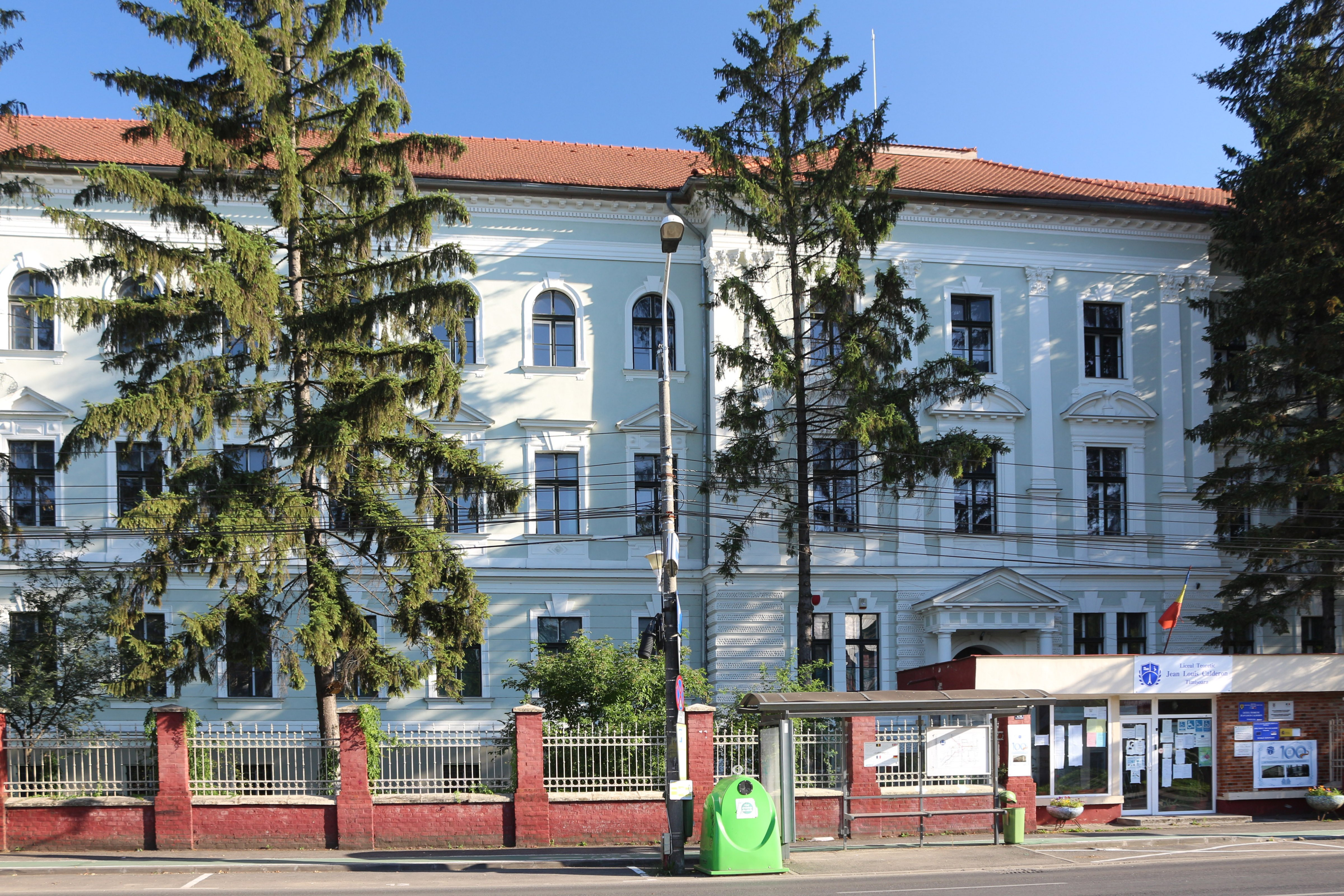

Location
- 14 Johann Heinrich Pestalozzi Street; Timișoara, Timiș County; Romania
- 45°45′14″N 21°14′35″E

Information
- Former names: Boys' Normal School (1774); Pedagogical College (1893)
- School type: Public, theoretical high school
- Established: 1774; 252 years ago
- Authority: Ministry of National Education
- Principal: Ion Ionici
- Enrollment: 920
- Language: Romanian, French, Spanish, Italian
- Website: jlcalderon.ro

Jean-Louis Calderon Theoretical High School (Romanian: Liceul Teoretic „Jean-Louis Calderon”; French: Lycée théorique Jean-Louis Calderon) is a high school in Timișoara, Romania. It is the only high school in Romania that has three bilingual sections: French, Spanish, and Italian. It has its origins in the Boys' Normal School, established in 1774/1775, which began as short-term courses aimed at providing structured training for teachers and later evolved into a preparatory institution for future educators. It is named after the French journalist Jean-Louis Calderon, killed in Bucharest during the events of December 1989.

The high school was awarded the title of "European School" and "Lycée du baccalauréat à mention bilingue francophone" by the Ministry of Education and the French Embassy.

== History ==
The Teachers' Training School in Timișoara traces its roots back to the 18th century, when Teodor Iancovici de Mirievschi—appointed in 1773 as director of the Romanian and Serbian schools in Banat—played a pivotal role in shaping regional education. During his tenure, which lasted until 1782 when he departed for Russia, Iancovici developed the Regulae directiveae, a school regulation for Banat that was approved by Maria Theresa in 1774. This document laid the foundation for the "organization of trivial schools in Banat" and included detailed guidelines on teacher training, subjects of instruction (such as reading, writing, and religion), the translation of books and textbooks, as well as numerous other educational recommendations. Teachers were required to pass an exam before being appointed and were strictly forbidden from practicing crafts or engaging in trade.

The Boys' Normal School in Timișoara was established in 1774/1775, during the reign of Joseph II, at the explicit request of Maria Theresa. At that time, the school was led by Albert Karlitzky and operated based on the didactic principles of Johann Ignaz von Felbiger, drawing inspiration from the educational philosophy of Johann Bernhard Basedow.

Initially, it functioned as a series of short-term courses designed to provide methodical guidance for teachers, later evolving into a preparatory school for teacher training. The general legislation developed during the reign of Maria Theresa granted various benefits to teachers. For instance, the Colonization Patent issued on 25 February 1763 stipulated the allocation of a 5,700 m² house lot, 24 jugers of arable land, and six jugers of pasture for teachers. Teachers' salaries were determined by several factors: their level of education and experience, the size of the locality where the school was located, the number of students, and the economic condition of the community. Salaries were not standardized and were funded from multiple sources. According to the Regulae directiveae issued on 14 April 1774, wages differed between rural and urban areas. The state offered modest salaries, ranging between 30, 40, or 60 florins per year, along with two jugers of pasture and a double house lot. In larger communities, salaries could reach up to 80 florins per year.

After the death of Joseph II, classes were suspended for two years (1790–1792), but resumed in 1793 and continued until 1844. Over this period, 664 teachers graduated. In the late Josephinist period, a teacher's salary in Timișoara typically rose to 120 florins annually. In rural areas, teachers also received in-kind contributions from parents—such as 75 liters of grain per student.

The curriculum of these courses evolved significantly over time. Initially, instruction was conducted exclusively in German. A notable change occurred in 1777, when a pedagogical course for teachers was offered in Romanian. By 1786, the subjects included writing, reading, music, singing, teaching methodology, mathematics, and correspondence. In the 1803/1804 academic year, Hungarian history and geography were added to the curriculum. Later, in 1814–1815, natural sciences replaced Hungarian history. In 1817, German was introduced as a subject and remained part of the program until 1821, when it was replaced by national history and physics. Hungarian was not included as a subject until 1824. Starting in 1834, the language of instruction officially switched to Hungarian.

This pedagogical tradition was carried forward by the teacher training college established at the initiative of the city council, which also benefited from the relocation of the state teacher training school from Zalău. Within this framework, the State Teacher Training School of Timișoara was officially opened in 1893. That same year, construction began on a dedicated building for the new institution, and the work was completed two years later. The building, located on what is now Johann Heinrich Pestalozzi Street, was designed by architect Eduard Reiter and erected on land donated free of charge by the Brewery. It featured two floors, classrooms, a chancellery, laboratories, a museum, and a boarding facility. Until construction was completed, the preparandia, which consisted of four classes, operated within the municipal primary school building in the Cetate district. The first director of the Pedagogical College of Timișoara was Aladár Horváth, a certified high school teacher and deputy royal school inspector.

On 30 July 1914, most of the school's buildings were requisitioned by the military to set up a field hospital, which accommodated 210 patients and 40 military personnel. As a result, throughout the war, the school faced extremely difficult conditions for continuing educational activities, operating the boarding school, and providing meals for students. To maintain boarding services, the college was forced to rent an additional building, which meant that only the most disadvantaged students could be accommodated in the school's boarding facility. The rest had to find lodging in private homes. Similarly, the canteen services were reserved for students in financial need. Classes were conducted in small, overcrowded rooms, and physical education lessons took place in the schoolyard—though these were suspended during bad weather. The difficult conditions led to a rise in illness among students, with significant challenges in ensuring medical care and proper supervision of the sick. Ironically, the only benefit brought by the military presence was improved access to water, thanks to a directive issued by the army.

On 1 September 1919, the school was officially taken over by the Romanian state. Its first Romanian director was Atanasie Popovici, who carried out the takeover and directed the school until 1937, year in which he was appointed counselor at the Romanian legation in Belgrade for the management of Romanian education in the Yugoslav part of Banat. As student enrollment grew, the original school building became insufficient, prompting the construction of two additional buildings. During World War II, the school also provided shelter and education for refugee students from Northern Transylvania. Following the education reform under Decree 175/1948, the Teachers' Training School was restructured into a Pedagogical School. Later, in 1959, a decision by the People's Council Committee led to its merger with the Pedagogical Institute of Arad, with both students and staff being relocated to Arad.

From 1959, the building served as the Inter-County Party School, and in 1990, it was transformed into the Jean Louis Calderon Theoretical High School of Timișoara. The school offered primary classes (with intensive French), middle school, and high school education. The high school section included Romanian-taught classes that had been transferred from Nikolaus Lenau and Béla Bartók High Schools, featuring specializations such as: French bilingual, mathematics-computer science, mathematics-physics, chemistry-biology, mechanics, and philology. In 1992, the mechanics specialization was discontinued, and an intensive Spanish language class was introduced. Thus, in the 1992/1993 academic year, the Jean Louis Calderon Theoretical High School became the first high school in western Romania to offer intensive Spanish language instruction at the high school level. The school continued to diversify its language offerings: an intensive Italian language class was introduced in 1999, followed by an Italian bilingual class in 2004. On 1 October 2007, the high school merged with General School No. 28, resulting in a structure of four classes per grade level in the lower cycle, and five classes at the high school level.

== Current status ==
The Jean-Louis Calderon Theoretical High School is a comprehensive educational institution that offers primary, lower secondary, and upper secondary education, with both science (real) and humanities tracks, as well as bilingual and intensive language programs. The school currently serves a total of 920 students. It is the only high school in Romania to offer three bilingual sections: French, Spanish, and Italian. In accordance with intergovernmental agreements between Romania and France, Spain, and Italy, students in these bilingual programs are eligible to take the baccalaureate exams specific to each partner country. The Jean-Louis Calderon Theoretical High School is part of a select group of schools nationwide included in this international academic program.

Since 2006, the high school has served as an official examination center for the French language (DELF) for the entire western region of Romania, under the patronage of the French Embassy in Romania and the International Center for Pedagogical Studies in Sèvres, France. Starting in 2008, the school also became an Italian language examination center (CELI), in collaboration with the Italian Consulate and the University for Foreigners of Perugia, Italy. Additionally, since the 2016–2017 school year, students enrolled in the Romanian–Spanish bilingual sections have been able to take the international DELE exam directly at the high school. In 2015, the school also became an accredited ECDL (European Computer Driving License) testing center.
