= Bogoslovija =

Bogoslovija (Serbian Cyrillic: Богословија) is a Serbian-Croatian word for a seminary. In particular it is often used for secondary schools educating future Orthodox priests.

== Serbian Orthodox Seminaries ==
- Serbian Orthodox Seminary of St. Sava, Belgrade, Serbia
- Serbian Orthodox Seminary of St. Arsenije, Sremski Karlovci, Serbia
- Serbian Orthodox Seminary of Sts. Cyril and Methodius, Prizren
- Serbian Orthodox Seminary of St. Peter of Cetinje, Cetinje
- Serbian Orthodox Seminary of St. Three Hierarchs, Krka Monastery
- Serbian Orthodox Seminary of St. John Chrysostom, Kragujevac, Serbia
- Serbian Orthodox Seminary of St. Peter of Dabar-Bosnia, Foča
- Serbian Orthodox Seminary of St. Sava, Libertyville, Illinois

== Localities ==
- Bogoslovija, a neighbourhood of Belgrade, Serbia
