= Weissert =

Weissert is a German-language surname. Notable people with the name include the following:

- Augustus G. Weissert (1844–1923), US soldier
- David Weissert (1913–1989), US politician
- Ernst Weissert (1905–1981), German anthroposophist
- Greg Weissert (born 1995), American baseball player

== See also ==
- Weissert, Nebraska
