= William Shakespeare High School =

William Shakespeare Theoretical High School
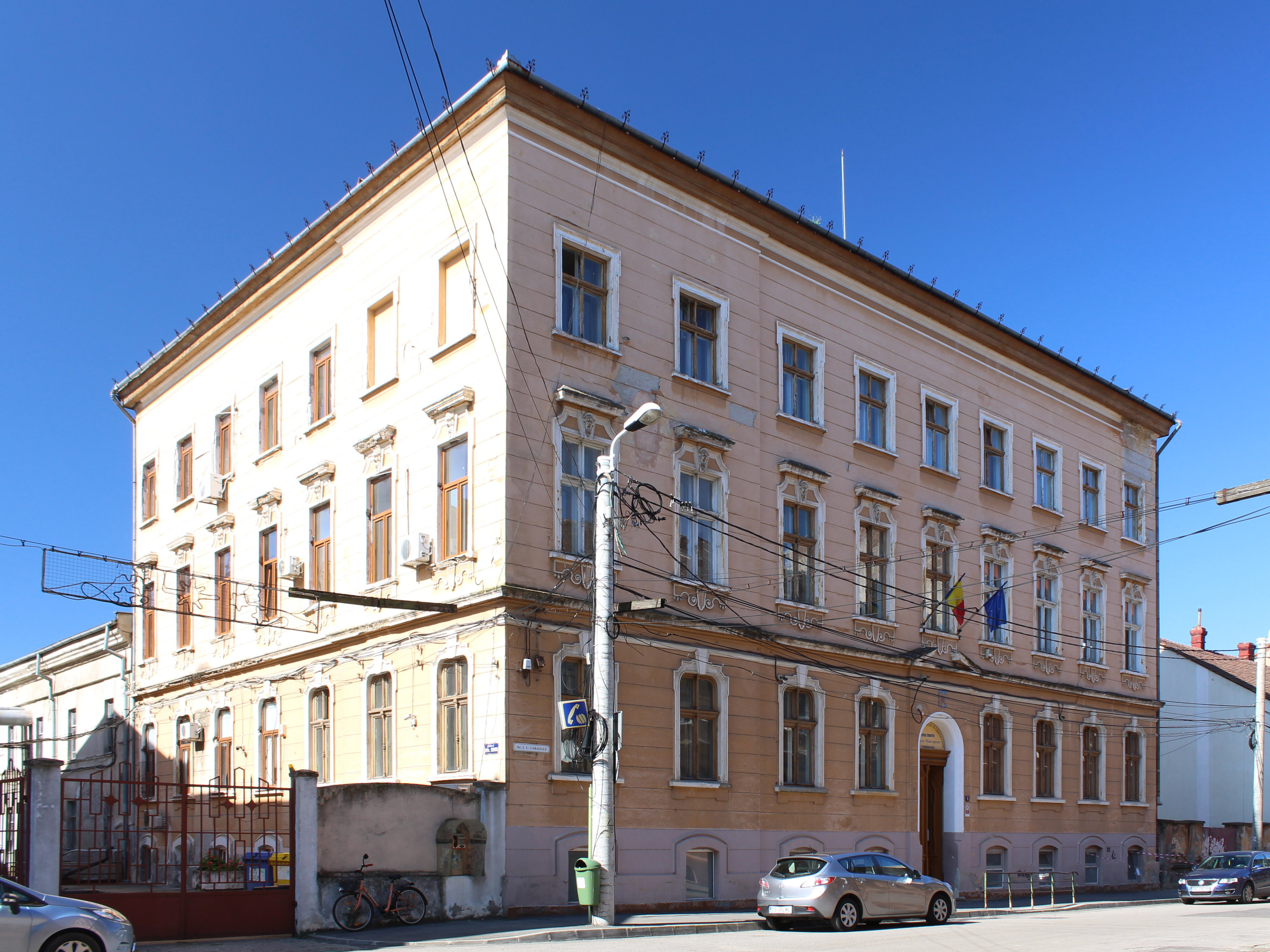

Location
- 6 Ion Luca Caragiale Street; Timișoara, Timiș County; Romania
- Coordinates: 45.756452°N 21.2371724°E

Information
- School type: Public, theoretical high school
- Established: 1990; 35 years ago
- Authority: Ministry of National Education
- Principal: Claudiu Crepcea
- Language: Romanian, English
- Website: williamshakespeare.ro

William Shakespeare Theoretical High School (Romanian: Liceul Teoretic „William Shakespeare”) is a high school in Timișoara, Romania. It is a high school with a bilingual and intensive English focus, structured across three educational levels: primary, middle school, and high school. The high school is also affiliated with the Extended Daycare Center No. 44 at 1 Iosif Vulcan Street.

The high school is located in an eclectic historicist-style palace built in 1898, originally owned by Austrian hatmaker Georg Ladstätter. From 1948 to 1992, the building served as the home of the Technical High School for Land Improvements, later renamed in 1954 as the Technical High School for Agricultural Improvements. The building is a historical monument, part of the Fabric urban ensemble (II) – TM-II-a-A-06097.

== History ==
While bilingual classes had existed in high schools in major Romanian cities such as Cluj-Napoca and Bucharest prior to 1990—though they were abolished during the 1980s—Timișoara only had high schools offering instruction in minority languages. As a result, one of the main aspirations of local English teachers was to establish a bilingual school. This vision became a reality in September 1990, with the founding of the English School, which initially opened with two first-grade and two fifth-grade classes, operating in the building that now houses the Banat National College.

In the following school year, the program expanded to include first, second, fifth, and sixth grades. Additionally, a high school class with a humanities profile was introduced, offering eight hours of English per week, with geography and physics taught in English. It was not until the next academic year that the school received its own dedicated building (the current location), an official name, and a permanent teaching staff. By the fall of 1992, the high school had two classes each for grades I, II, III, V, VI, and VII, as well as two ninth-grade classes—one with a humanities profile and one with a science profile—and a single tenth-grade class.

The initial bilingual model at the primary level lasted only until 1996. After that, students continued with intensive English instruction, while all other subjects were taught exclusively in Romanian. Meanwhile, at the secondary and high school levels, the program became more diverse: native English-speaking teachers from the United Kingdom and the United States joined the faculty each year, teaching both English language and literature, as well as subjects like history and geography in English. This approach was further supported by several Romanian teachers who were fluent in English and taught partially or entirely in English.
