= Aktion Deutschland Hilft =

Collection of German aid organizations

- Abbreviation: ADH
- Established: 6 March 2001 (25 years ago)
- Legal status: Registered association
- Aim: Emergency aid
- Headquarters: Bonn
- Country: Germany
- Membership: 13 (2024)
- Chief Executives: Maria Rüther, Thilo Reichenbach, Markus Gieske
- Chairpersons: Edith Wallmeier
- Revenue: 79,285,424.06 (2024)
- Total Assets: 237,164,998.87 (2024)
- Employees: 64 (2024)
- Volunteers: 10 (2025)
- Awards: DZI Seal-of-Approval
- Website: www.aktion-deutschland-hilft.de/en/

Aktion Deutschland Hilft e.V. – Bündnis der Hilfsorganisationen (ADH) (Campaign Germany helps association - alliance of German aid organisations) is a connection of German aid agencies for humanitarian aid, with the target of helping faster and more efficiently through coordination and combination of efforts in case of a disaster and to raise donations together. The association is headquartered in Bonn.

== History ==
=== In Germany ===
Aktion Deutschland Hilft was founded in 2001 with headquarters in Cologne, to combine the capabilities of German aid organisations, so that fast and efficient disaster aid can be guaranteed abroad. Reasons for action are wars and conflicts, famines, earthquakes, floodings, emergencies concerning the environment and other unpredictable disasters. In June 2006 the alliance moved to Bonn.

Aktion Deutschland Hilft includes 24 German aid organizations, which raise donations together and coordinate their measures.

=== Areas of disaster relief ===
Aktion Deutschland Hilft is activated after a decision from its member organisations. Examples of disasters it responded to include the 2003 invasion of Iraq, the War in Darfur (August 2004), the 2004 Indian Ocean earthquake and tsunami, the 2005 Kashmir earthquake, the 2006 Pangandaran earthquake and tsunami, the 2007 African floods, the 2007 Tabasco flood and cyclones in Bangladesh (March 2008) and Myanmar (May 2008). In 2009 Aktion Deutschland Hilft was active for refugees in Sri Lanka (May), and victims of an earthquake in Indonesia in August and October as well as for people hit by the 2009 West Africa floods. In 2010 there was action for 2010 Haiti earthquake, the 2010 Chile earthquake and the 2010 Pakistan floods. In 2011 the alliance took action for the victims of 2011 Tōhoku earthquake and tsunami and the 2011 East Africa drought. In 2012 the alliance was busy with the 2012 Sahel drought and Refugees of the Syrian Civil War. The year 2013 was dominated by 2013 European floods, the 2013 North India floods and Typhoon Haiyan on the Philippines.

In subsequent years, the alliance responded to further major crises, including the COVID-19 pandemic, the war in Ukraine (since 2022), the Sudan conflict (since 2023), and the 2023 Turkey–Syria earthquake. In 2026, member organisations were active in response to the Ebola outbreak in the Democratic Republic of the Congo, an earthquake in Colombia, and flash floods in Nepal.

== Organization ==
=== Leadership ===
Since September 2026, Dr Frank-Walter Steinmeier, Federal President of the Federal Republic of Germany, has been the current patron of Aktion Deutschland Hilft. The former Federal President, Horst Köhler was patron of Aktion Deutschland Hilft until his death in February 2025.

Aktion Deutschland Hilft has a board of trustees. The trustees are appointed for a three-year term by the general meeting. In September 2026, Dr Johann Wadephul, Federal Minister for Foreign Affairs, took over as Chair of the Board of Trustees. Annalena Baerbock, former Federal Minister for Foreign Affairs, served as chair of the Board of Trustees from November 2022 until she stepped down from this role in 2025. Heiko Maas, then Federal Minister for Foreign Affairs, took over as chair in 2018.

The Executive Board and the Special Supervisory Body are key supervisory, advisory and decision-making bodies within Aktion Deutschland Hilft. All members of both bodies serve in a voluntary capacity. The Chair of the Executive Board is Stefan Ewers from CARE Deutschland. The management team consists of Maria Rüther (Chief Executive), Thilo Reichenbach (Managing Director of Marketing & Fundraising) and Markus Gieske (Managing Director of Finance, Administration, Human Resources and IT).

=== Membership ===
In 2026 Aktion Deutschland Hilft had the following member-organizations:

- action medeor
- ADRA Deutschland
- Arbeiter-Samariter-Bund Deutschland
- AWO International
- CARE Germany-Luxemburg
- Habitat for Humanity
- Help – Hilfe zur Selbsthilfe (help people to help themselves)
- Johanniter-Unfall-Hilfe
- Malteser Germany
- Der Paritätische Wohlfahrtsverband
  - arche noVa
  - Bundesverband Rettungshunde Search and rescue dogs
  - Friends of Waldorf Education
  - Hammer Forum
  - Handicap International
  - HelpAge Deutschland
  - Kinderhilfswerk Global-Care (help for children)
  - LandsAid
  - Solidaritätsdienst International
  - Terra Projekte International
- World Vision Deutschland
- Zentralwohlfahrtsstelle der Juden in Deutschland (Jewish helping organization)

Membership is open to all charitable organizations located in Germany as long as they fulfill the membership criteria and keep its standards. Associated members of the ADH are the Bundesverband Digitale Wirtschaft and the People's Solidarity.

== Quality-standards in disaster-help ==
Member organisations are subjected to national and international accepted norms and agreements, for example:

- Codex of the International Red Cross and Red Crescent Movement
- "Twelve basic rules of German humanitarian aid abroad" of the German government,
- "Sphere Project" (Humanitarian Charter and Minimum Standards in Disaster Response)
- "NGDO-Charter", Basic Principles of Development and Humanitarian Aid NGOs in the European Union.
- "Initiative Transparente Zivilgesellschaft" of Transparency International

All financed projects are audited by external controllers.

== Self-concept ==
Aktion Deutschland Hilft aims to get disaster relief quickly to the victims and tailored to the mission. In the disaster zone there is close cooperation between the organizations to guarantee maximum outcome.

== Donations ==
The cooperation helps member organizations to reduce costs and to provide the maximum amount of donations direct into the projects. Common advertisement and one bank connection help to achieve this goal. The costs and incomes get split between the organizations. Additional to that a supportive membership of individuals is possible.
