= Notre Dame Church, Timișoara =

Catholic church in Timișoara, Romania

Notre Dame Church
- Biserica Notre Dame
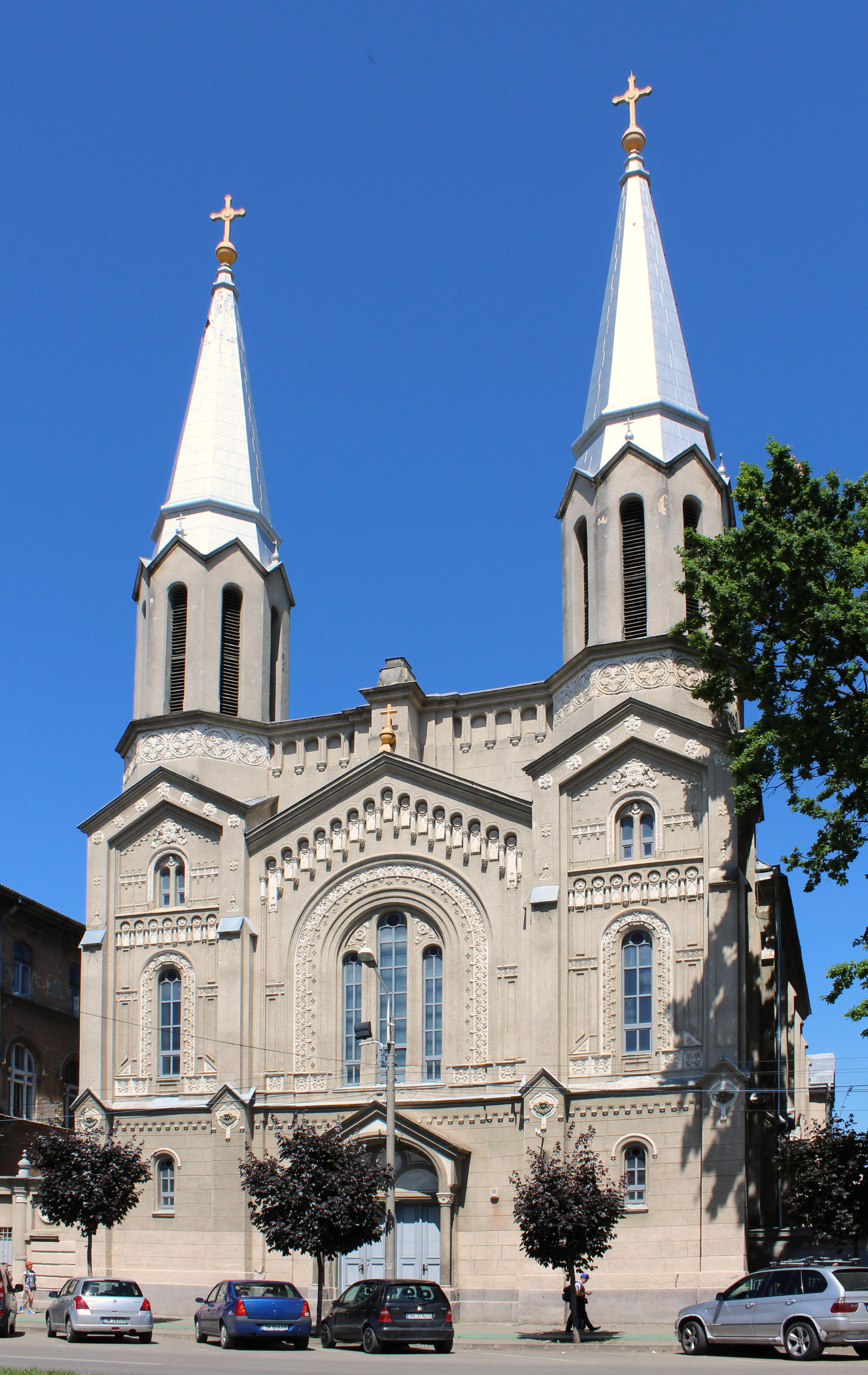

Religion
- Affiliation: Roman Catholic
- Patron: Sacred Heart of Jesus
- Year consecrated: 1895
- Status: Active

Location
- Location: 4 General Ion Dragalina Boulevard, Timișoara
- Interactive map of Notre Dame Church
- Coordinates: 45°44′37″N 21°12′45″E

Architecture
- Architect: Eduard Reiter
- Style: Historicist
- Groundbreaking: 1893
- Completed: 1894

Notre Dame Church is a Roman Catholic church in the Iosefin district of Timișoara, Romania. It is part of a former monastery complex built for the School Sisters of Notre Dame, established in Timișoara (Hungarian: Temesvár) in 1864, then Kingdom of Hungary. In the current Dositej Obradović High School were the homes of the nuns, and the building of the Banat College was the Girls' School. The church currently serves the Catholic community of Banat Bulgarians.

== History ==
In 1864, at the initiative of the bishop of the Diocese of Csanád (based in Timișoara), Sándor Csajághy, six nuns of the School Sisters of Notre Dame came to Timișoara in order to set up a girls' school. Originally located in the Cetate district, the school became too small, and starting with 1881, the construction of an educational complex in Iosefin began, with financial help from the new bishop of Csanád, Sándor Bonnaz. At the end of the 19th century, the Notre Dame monastery complex in Iosefin included the elementary school, the children's daycare, the girls' high school, the pedagogical high school, as well as the monastery building, the boarding school, including the dormitories for the students and the communal school building. The monastery also managed a kindergarten and a school where handicrafts were taught.

The church was built between 1893 and 1894 in historicist style and consecrated on 8 October 1895, with the patron saint of the Sacred Heart of Jesus. The four bells were made by Anton Novotny's foundry workshop in Timișoara, and the organ is the work of Leopold Wegenstein from Timișoara. The main and side altars were made by the Tyrolean sculptor Ferdinand Stufflesser. The pews and interior paneling were crafted by the carpenter Josef Gertheisz.
