= Waldorf High School =

Location
- 14 Uranus Street, Timișoara, Romania
- Coordinates: 45.7341883°N 21.2451173°E

Information
- Type: Public
- Established: 1993
- Founder: Rudolf Steiner Foundation
- Authority: Ministry of Education and Research
- Principal: Alexandrina Bradea
- Staff: 49
- Faculty: 39
- Enrollment: 446
- Language: Romanian
- Website: waldorftm.ro

The Waldorf High School is an alternative state educational institution in Timișoara, Romania. It offers a complete continuum of pre-university education, encompassing kindergarten, primary school, middle school, and high school. It is managed by the Rudolf Steiner Foundation, founded in 1993 and a member of the Waldorf Federation in Romania.

== History ==
The Rudolf Steiner Foundation was founded in 1993. In 1994, the Timișoara Local Council granted the Foundation free use of a 2.5-hectare plot of land intended for the construction of the Waldorf High School. In 1997, Ingeborg Christoff donated funds to the Foundation to purchase the house at 30 Salcâmilor Street. There, she established the "House for Waldorf Pedagogy," which became a space for parent and teacher meetings, as well as handicraft and music workshops for children. Over time, the Salcâmilor house also became the headquarters of the Rudolf Steiner Foundation and the Timișoara branch of the Anthroposophical Society.

Between 1998 and 2000, the central building was constructed, and the two side buildings were added, funded by the German Ministry for International Cooperation, the Friends of Waldorf Education, the Die Stuetze Association, and private donors. The first high school class was launched in 1999.

In 2005, with support from Software AG and the Friends of Waldorf Education, a kindergarten building was constructed, followed by an additional building in 2016. In 2010, the workshop building was opened. As the school outgrew its existing facilities, the Foundation, together with Timișoara City Hall, applied for funding from the European Regional Development Fund to build a new gymnasium. Construction began in 2022 and was completed in 2024. The building houses eight classrooms, 12 laboratories, workshops and offices, a multi-purpose hall, and two afterschool rooms.
