= Ion Vidu National College of Art =

- Colegiul Național de Artă „Ion Vidu”
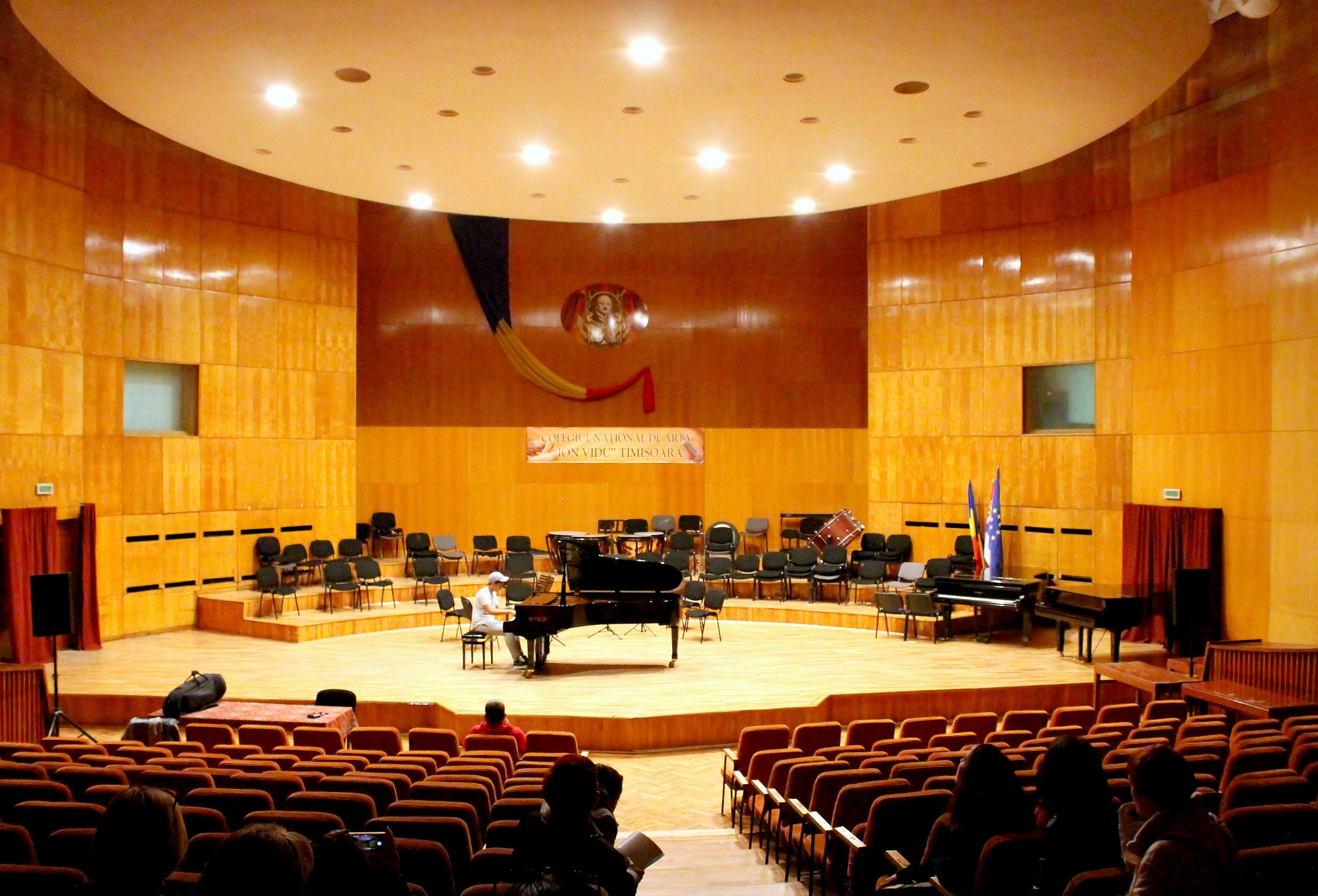
- Mihai Perian Concert Hall

Location
- 2 Cluj Street; Timișoara, Timiș County; Romania
- Coordinates: 45°44′48″N 21°14′4″E

Information
- Type: Arts high school
- Established: 1950; 75 years ago
- Authority: Ministry of National Education
- Principal: Sanda Moldovanu
- Faculty: 115 (2017/2018)
- Enrollment: 669 (2017/2018)
- Language: Romanian
- Website: liceulionvidu.ro

Ion Vidu National College of Art (Romanian: Colegiul Național de Artă „Ion Vidu”) is an arts high school located at 2 Cluj Street, Timișoara, Romania. Founded in 1906, the school has 18 classrooms, 54 instrumental study rooms, and the 340-seat Mihai Perian Concert Hall.

== History ==
The college has its origins in 1906 when, on 30 October, the City Hall approved the establishment of a music school – Communal Conservatory – at 1 Emanoil Ungureanu Street. Starting with 1946, the Communal Conservatory was transformed into a Conservatory of Music and Dramatic Arts and then into an Art Institute with two faculties: music and theater. The musical tradition of the Art Institute, abolished in 1950, was taken over in the same year by the Technical High School of Music. From the autumn of 1957, in addition to the music department, a plastic arts department will also function here, the high school changing its name several times.

In 1968 the two sections split, and the Ion Vidu Music High School moved to the headquarters designed by the couple of architects Hans and Aurelia Fackelmann at 12 Cluj Street, where it still functions today. A year later, the 340-seat Mihai Perian Concert Hall was inaugurated, considered by some specialists to be "the hall with the best acoustics in Southeastern Europe". In 1977, the two schools merge again. With the Revolution of 1989, the two separated definitively, and a new section was added to the Music High School, the choreography section, named after its founder, choreographer Ștefan Gheorghe. In 2000, 50 years after the establishment of the first music school, the Ion Vidu Music High School was transformed into the Ion Vidu National College of Art, where the two existing sections, music and choreography, will function. A third section – theater – was created later by film director Diogene Bihoi.
