= Dušanovac, Negotin =

Dušanovac Душановац Geanova
- Village
- Location within Serbia
- Country: Serbia
- District: Bor District
- Municipality: Negotin

Population (2002)
  - Total: 882
- Time zone: UTC+1 (CET)
  - Summer (DST): UTC+2 (CEST)

Dušanovac (Serbian: Душановац; Romanian: Geanova) is a village in the municipality of Negotin, Serbia. According to the 2002 census, the village has a population of 882 people.

== Notable people ==
- Atanasie Popovici (c. 1887–1958), Timok Romanian (Vlach) schoolteacher, minority rights activist and irredentist
