= Saint Sava Serbian Orthodox Seminary =

Eastern Orthodox seminary in Belgrade, Serbia

Coordinates: 44.8157°N 20.4918°E

- Српска православна богословија Светог Саве
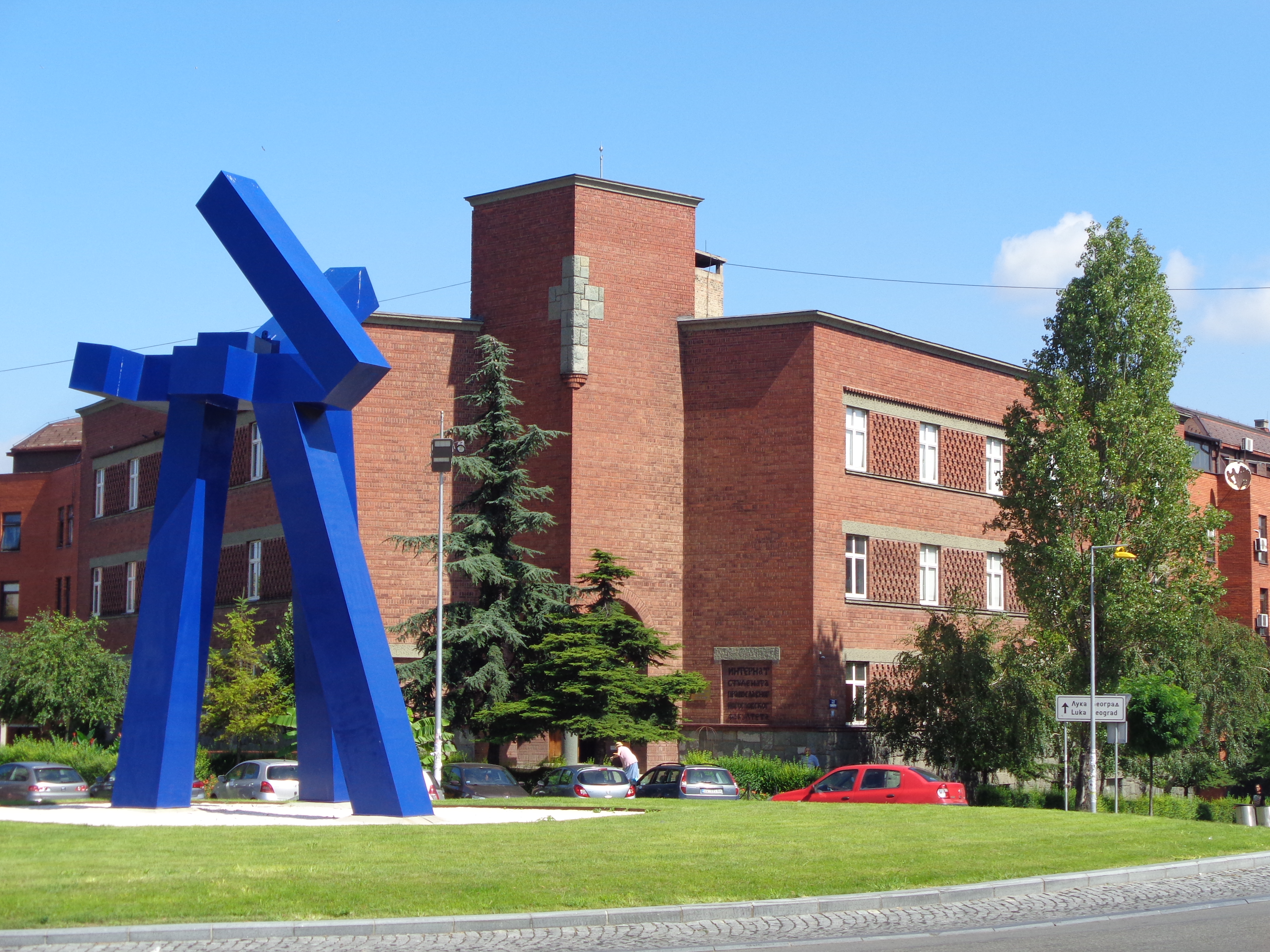
- Mije Kovačevića 11; Belgrade; Serbia

Information
- Type: Seminary
- Religious affiliation: Eastern Orthodox
- Established: 1794
- Language: Serbian
- Campus: Urban
- Website: Official website

Saint Sava Serbian Orthodox Seminary (Serbian: Српска православна богословија Светог Саве, romanized: Srpska pravoslavna bogoslovija Svetog Save) is a secondary educational institution of the Serbian Orthodox Church located in Belgrade, Serbia. A boarding school, it prepares future clergymen for service in the Serbian Orthodox Church.

== History ==
The Seminary of Saint Sava is the bearer of the tradition of the previous First Seminary in Serbia, founded in 1808 in Belgrade, thanks to the merits of Dositej Obradović, then the Minister of Education of the Governing Council of Karađorđe's Serbia. For the needs of the school, he ceded his house on the corner of Braće Jugovića and Dositejeva streets, which he had previously "received from the people ". The house had 14 rooms, two kitchens, a veranda, a large hamamdžik (public bathhouse) and a large stable in an open courtyard. Soon, approval was obtained for the establishment of a theological school that would educate future priests.

The first rector of the seminary was Vićentije Rakić, abbot of the Fenek Monastery. The seminary operated only until 1813, when Belgrade in Revolutionary Serbia was reoccupied by the Turks. The education of theologians in the Principality of Serbia was temporarily stopped, then resumed 1836. In the Clerical School at the Prince Miloš Obrenović's Residence in Kragujevac, thanks to the Metropolitanate of Belgrade Petar Jovanović.

Metropolitan Mihailo Jovanović renewed the education of theologians in Belgrade in 1873, when he opened the second department of theology for the training of priests that were to proselytize in areas that were still part of the Ottoman Empire. In 1896, it was renamed Saint Sava Seminary.

In 1920 the seminary was relocated to Sremski Karlovci ceasing its operations in 1941 when Nazi Germany invaded the Kingdom of Yugoslavia. Its work resumed in 1949 at the Rakovica Monastery. Since 1957 it has been located in a building that was built before World War II as a dormitory for the Faculty of the Orthodox Theology in Karaburma, designed by Aleksandar Deroko. The seminary finally received a purpose-built building that meets all the requirements for its work and includes a chapel dedicated to its patron, Saint Sava.

== Courses and curriculum ==
Seminary education lasts five years. Students study Bible (Old Testament, New Testament), Bible history, history of the Christianity, church singing, catechism, apology of faith, Liturgy, patrology, dogmatics, Canon law, pedagogy, homily, history of religion with Sects, History of the Serbian Orthodox Church, philosophy, ethics with Asceticism, and computer science. In addition to Serbian, students also study Russian, Greek, English, and Church Slavonic.

== Alumni ==
- Serbian Romanian schoolteacher, minority rights activist and irredentist Atanasie Popovici
- Metropolitan Amfilohije Radović
- Bishop Nikolaj Velimirović, later canonized as Saint Nicholas of Ohrid and Žiča

== Sources ==
- Slijepčević, Đoko (1979). Mihailo, Metropolit von Serbien (in German). pp. 194–196.
