= Macedo-Romanians =

Macedo-Romanians or Macedo-Romanian may refer to:

- The Aromanians, an Eastern Romance people inhabiting the Balkans, including the region of Macedonia
  - The Aromanian language, the language of the Aromanians
- The Megleno-Romanians, another Eastern Romance people exclusively inhabiting the region of Macedonia
  - The Megleno-Romanian language, the language of the Megleno-Romanians

== See also ==
- Macedo-Romanian Cultural Society, an Aromanian cultural organization in Romania
