= Ernst Weissert =

German Waldorf teacher and Anthroposophist

Ernst Weissert, born 20 July 1905 in Mannheim Germany and died 2 January 1981 in Stuttgart was a teacher, general secretary of the Anthroposophical Society in Germany and co-founder and director of the Bund der Freien Waldorfschulen (Federation of free Waldorf schools), the Hague Circle and the Friends of Waldorf Education.

== Childhood and Studies ==
Ernst Weissert was born in Mannheim and was strongly influenced by its architecture, theatre and the art prevailing there. His father was a teacher at the Mannheim Hilfsschule (Mannheim special school) as well as tutor to wealthy Jewish families. Ernst went to the local state school and later the Karl-Friedrich-Gymnasium. At the age of 13, he lived through the end of World War I and the accompanying revolution, which led him to join the liberal party. In 1919/20, he began to take part in the events of the left wingers and the so-called “Wandervögel” (Birds of Passage) where he forged friendships with young people that would become decisive for his future as they were seeking a life of truth and spiritually aware community. He began to act in theatre, first as an extra at the national theatre, then in principal roles in productions of his high school, and was preparing himself for life as an actor.

He met Rudolf Steiner, attending his lectures in Mannheim already at the age of 17 and, upon matriculating, he visited the second Teachers Conference of the Waldorf School in Stuttgart, where he encountered the educational impulse of Rudolf Steiner. Spontaneously, he decided upon a profession as a teacher. In 1924 he became a member of the Anthroposophical Society and of the pedagogical working group in Tübingen, in which students prepared themselves to teach at the Waldorf School. In the same year he took part in the three-week-long Drama Course and the Karma lectures of Rudolf Steiner in Dornach.

In 1926 Ernst Weissert pursued studies in Philology, and Archaeology in Heidelberg, but interrupted these to accompany a German family to Athens as personal tutor. There he got to know the director of the German Archaeological Institute, Ernst Buschor, a decisive meeting for his life. After this period, in which he immersed himself in everything Greek, above all in classical sculpture, he returned home to the Archaeological Institute in Heidelberg. In 1928 he met and married there a woman of German and Greek origin and soon fathered his first son. In 1930, he completed his studies and separated from his wife.

== Waldorf teaching ==
Soon after this he moved to Berlin. There he got to know his second wife, Elisabeth Caspari, and over the years had nine sons and three daughters with her. At Easter 1931, he began to teach at the Rudolf Steiner School in Berlin – initially Greek, Latin, French and Gymnastics, later as a Class teacher. The political situation for Elisabeth and Ernst Weissert was becoming difficult, as Elisabeth came from a noted Jewish family. In summer of 1937, when all teachers at private schools were required to take an oath of allegiance to Hitler, the College of Teachers of the Rudolf Steiner School decided of themselves to close the school. Ernst Weissert gave 85 of the children, amongst them 30 Jewish children, an orientation course for their new situation and thereafter began to work as a private tutor. On charges of “continuing to practice a forbidden pedagogy”, he was arrested by the Gestapo, but was released after a few weeks. In 1943 his wife and children were evacuated and in 1944 he himself moved to Tübingen until he received his call-up orders, which he was able to change to service in the Medical Corps in Ulm.

Immediately after the War, Weissert took over the public school in Weilheim with 82 children, and after Easter 1946 joined the Waldorf school in Stuttgart-Uhlandshöhe as high school teacher for the subjects German, History and History of Art. For 19 years he lived with his family in one of the modest prefabricated buildings on the school grounds that had been donated by the United States Armed Forces, continuing to teach at the school until 1968.

He actively participated in the rebuilding of the Anthroposophical Society in Germany from 1946 onwards, being elected onto its executive in 1959 and acting as one of its General Secretaries from 1961 to 1978.

== The “Bund der Freien Waldorfschulen ==
This German federation of schools had been hurriedly organised in 1933 to act as negotiating partner for the nine Waldorf schools in their dealings with the German authorities in Berlin at the time. It was now reconstituted by Ernst Weissert and Erich Schwebsch, who took on the leadership until his death in 1953. After this, the leadership was taken on by Ernst Weissert, and from 1969 onwards, he worked for the Federation on a full-time basis. At that time, there were 29 member schools. When the 1970s brought with them the rapid increase in new schools all over the world, he called on the School's movement to “leave behind us everything that is dated and wakefully grasp what is of the future.”

In his article “Pädagogische Religion” (Educational Religion), he describes how the capacity for creative teaching can begin to grow: “The teacher must always ask himself how he can develop a sense of closeness to the child.” He has to “strive to develop a spiritual-educational sense of touch”. “This sense of touch, or child-sense gradually opens an attitude of soul that is full of devotion, love, commitment.” And this “devotion in the face of the Young, the Growing, turns into the art of dealing with human beings as a spiritual task of the twentieth century.

== Founding initiatives ==
The initiatives founded by Ernst Weissert were far-reaching. With the annual Teacher’s Conferences, he aimed to bring progress to the school movement while connecting it with its origin. Starting in 1950, the first public Summer Conferences were organised, later becoming the Parent-Teacher Conferences in 1956. In these the entire aspect of the school movement could be experienced – something he knew how to portray in an inspiring manner.

The Newsletter for Teachers (Lehrerrundbrief); the Educational Research Unit (Pädagogische Forschungsstelle); the “Gründunswilligen-Treffen”, a meeting of all new initiatives desiring to found a Waldorf school, are all to be led back to his initiative. For the international schools movement he suggested the Hague Circle and, in order to serve as an international perceptive and support organisation, he founded the Friends of Waldorf Education in 1971.

== His role in German education ==
Professor Hellmut Becker, erstwhile director of the Max-Planck-Institut für Bildungsforschung in Berlin, refers to him as the “father of the Steiner/Waldorf schools” in his obituary in “Die Zeit”: .””

“In the Third Reich the Steiner schools – just as they are today in the DDR – were forbidden. After 1945, Erich Schwebsch and Ernst Weissert together with many other friends rebuilt the movement once again. By 1968 there were already 29 schools, from 1971 until today (1981) the number has risen from 35 to 70. (…) The father of seventy schools not only affected the course of these schools right up to the year 1981, when the light of his eyes had already nearly dimmed, with unbroken vitality and inspiration; he at the same time raised his own 13 highly gifted children, who today all stand successfully in professional life. When I advised him 15 years ago to devote himself exclusively to his leadership function within the Bund der Freien Waldorfschulen and to, at least stop teaching, he answered me, “If I only organise, I stop living. I have to be able to look into the eyes of the children. I have to teach – then I can also organise the teaching of others.”

‘Many Germans regard the Waldorf school as a sectarian school. One should know that the large mass of Waldorf parents – presumably around 90% - are non-anthroposophists who entrust their children to this school movement because they are enthusiastic about the educational work done and because their children are happy there. It has not been easy for the school movement. Because of its fundamental attitude against educational selection – children in Waldorf schools are promoted according to their age – it was difficult to fit them into the state examination system.

Professor Becker describes how in negotiations with the different educational departments, Ernst Weissert and his colleagues achieved that through a bridging class at the end of a Waldorf schooling, students would be able to enter the state matriculation, in which they performed with better than average results.

“But Ernst Weissert also contradicted the accusation of sectarianism in another manner. While still working together with Erich Schwebsch, he led the schools movement into a working community with Jesuits and Moravians, with private boarding schools and Montessori schools. The Association of Free Schools (Arbeitsgemeinschaft Freier Schulen) that all the private schools belong to today, is indicative of the overcoming of the concept of sectarianism.” He saw to it that the Waldorf schools did not remain in a ghetto of the like-minded but exercised their influence beyond the borders of their own schools. He was also the central contact “for the international Waldorf schools, from Scotland to New York, from Stockholm to South Africa.” .””
