= Casa Verde College =

Casa Verde Technological High School of Forestry and Agriculture Liceul Tehnologic de Silvicultură și Agricultură „Casa Verde”

Location
- Timișoara, Romania
- Coordinates: 45°46′44″N 21°16′18″E

Information
- Former name: Professional School of Foresters (1885–1919); Secondary Forestry School (1919–1969); Forestry High School (1969–1990)
- Type: Public
- Established: 27 October 1885
- Principal: Mariana Eftimie
- Faculty: 38
- Enrollment: 327
- Website: lcasaverde.ro

Casa Verde College, officially known as Casa Verde Technological High School of Forestry and Agriculture after the merger by absorption in 2015 with the Petru Botiș Agricultural Technological High School, is a forestry and agricultural school in Timișoara, Romania. It is housed in an 18th-century hunting lodge.

== History ==
The high school is located in the former hunting lodge, originally built during the Turkish occupation and later restored under Count Claude Florimond de Mercy. The lodge dates back to the time of the great plague epidemic of 1738–39, during which over 1,000 of the fortress's 6,000 inhabitants perished. During the outbreak, the site served as a hospital—an assumption supported by discoveries of human remains alongside silver coins bearing the image of Saint Mary from 1503, coins marked with the emblem "Herzog von Brandenburg," silver pieces from the reign of Emperor Leopold I (1658–1705), and bronze coins from the times of Empress Maria Theresa and Emperor Franz Joseph I, as well as weapons and weapon fragments. The original structure had an octagonal layout, and 19th-century photographs highlight its distinctly Turkish architectural features.

The pavilion was renovated in 1763, a date still visible on one of the castle's beams. It was here, in 1849, that General Bem, leader of Kossuth's revolutionary army, met with General Dembiński to assume command of the troops.

By the late 18th century, the castle had transformed into a popular social venue and was regarded as the most frequented recreational spot in the city. A 1900 monograph of Timișoara notes that the site featured a spacious restaurant with a circular dance hall, where guests would celebrate and dance until dawn.

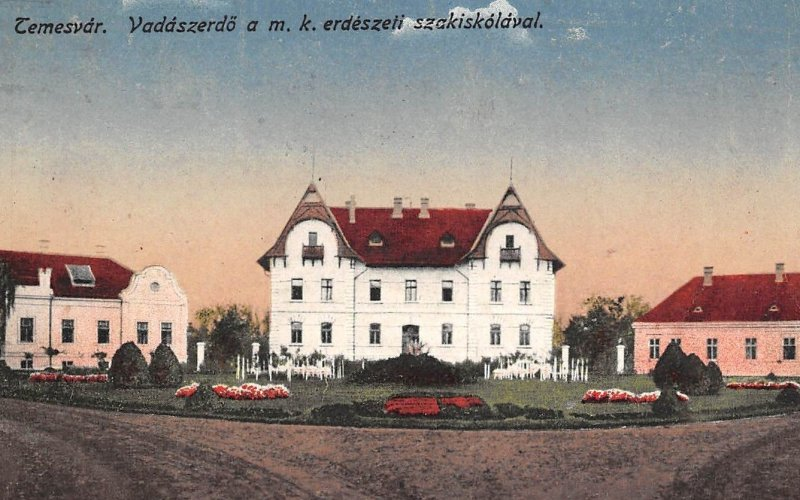
Casa Verde College (then Hungarian Royal Professional Forestry School) in 1911

The forestry school was officially inaugurated on 27 October 1885, making it the first institution of its kind within present-day Romania. It opened with just ten students, and the program spanned two years, divided into four semesters. For practical training, 1,230 jugers of forest from the Green Forest were allocated, along with 24 jugers for a dendrological park and 26 jugers for a nursery. The park also housed an apiary. Additionally, the school was equipped with a meteorological station and an experimental research station.

Since 1885, the institution has been known as the Professional School of Foresters, and in 1919, it became the Secondary Forestry School. It has undergone many changes over the years, with its activities only interrupted in 1952, when it was evacuated and handed over to the Soviet army. From 1969 to 1990, the school was called the Forestry High School. It was later restructured into a school group and is now known as the Casa Verde Forestry College. Between 1990 and 2015, it was home to the Professional School of Foresters, serving students from the counties of Timiș, Caraș-Severin, Mehedinți, Gorj, Hunedoara, Alba, and Sibiu.

== Curriculum ==
At the Casa Verde Forestry College, 327 students are enrolled, guided by 38 teachers. The institution offers specialized education in forestry, tourism, environmental protection, and agrotourism. In addition to the high school programs (grades IX–XII), there is a post-secondary class for forestry technicians and two classes designed for adults wishing to become foresters. Additionally, the college provides a six-week course for motorists (chainsaw operators).
