= West Technical College =

Public school in Timișoara, Romania

- Colegiul Tehnic de Vest

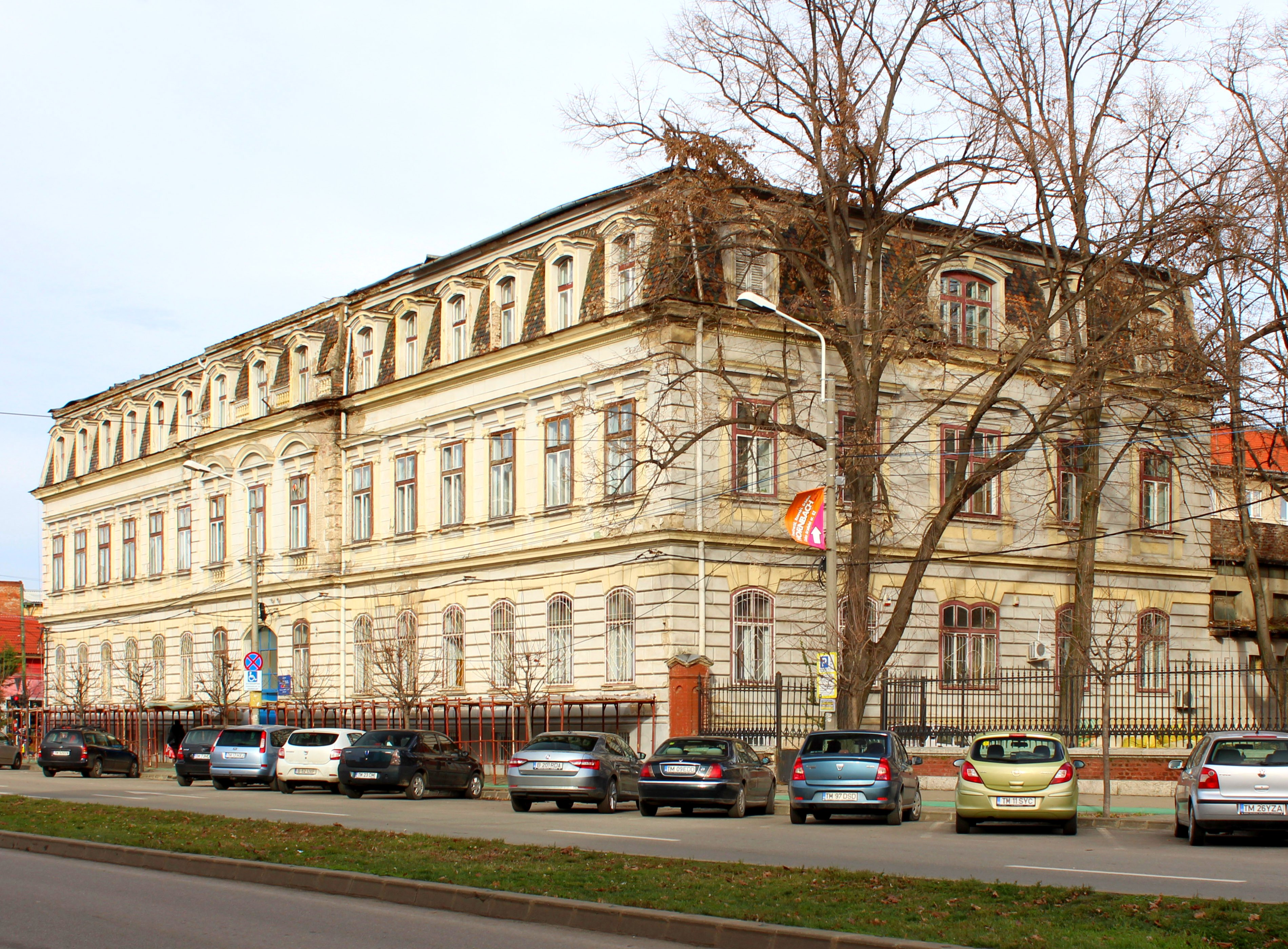

Location
- 11 King Carol I Boulevard, Timișoara
- 45°44′41″N 21°12′44″E

Information
- Other name: West Technological High School
- Type: Public
- Established: 1946
- Authority: Ministry of National Education
- Grades: IX–XIII
- Enrollment: 503 (2018/2019)
- Language: Romanian
- Website: www.ctvtm.ro

The West Technical College (Romanian: Colegiul Tehnic de Vest) is a high school in Timișoara. It was founded in 1946 as a school for civil, industrial and agricultural constructions. It suffered numerous name changes since, but kept its profile as an industrial and construction-oriented institution. From 2018 onward, it is known as the West Technological High School (Romanian: Liceul Tehnologic de Vest). Currently, it is the only high school in Timiș County with a construction profile in which plumbers, masons, electricians, builders, carpenters, joiners and painters are trained.

The building that houses the high school is located in the site of historical monuments called Old Iosefin and was built in 1946 for school purposes. Between 2013 and 2017, the building also housed the city's High School of Fine Arts.
