= Friends of Waldorf Education =

The Friends of Waldorf Education (Freunde der Erziehungskunst Rudolf Steiners e. V.), referred to as the “Friends” below, is a charity association founded in 1971 registered in Stuttgart, Germany. The association fosters initiatives all over the world for a free education and organisations that work on the basis of Waldorf education.

As umbrella organisation for the German government-sponsored Voluntary Services, the association places approximately 1000 volunteers per year both inside Germany and internationally.

The branch “Crisis or Emergency Education” of the Friends of Waldorf Education carries out international War and Catastrophe assistance for traumatised children and young people since 2006.

== History ==
In 1969, Waldorf education celebrated the 50th anniversary of its establishment and was expanding increasingly throughout the world. In order to bring together a group of people who would support the growing school movement both ideally and financially, Ernst Weissert founded the Friends of Waldorf Education on 10 October 1971.

Ernst Weissert himself did not stand for membership of the Executive, leaving this task to his closest assistant and second member, Dr. Manfred Leist. Other members of the Executive were Günter Ziegenbein (member of the Board of the Waldorf school in the Kräherwald, Stuttgart), and Armin Scholter, the administrator of the same school. This guaranteed a secure existence for the association. Many former students of the Waldorf school, Uhlandshöhe became members and have, to a great extent, remained so until today. Both Ernst Weissert and Manfred Leist had, however, other pressing tasks in building up the German school's movement and within the leadership of the Bund der Freien Waldorfschulen, so that there was little time left over for this association.

In 1976, certain former Waldorf students had the idea of founding a Worldwide School's association. Ernst Weissert took up this intention and offered them the Association Friends of Waldorf Education as a legal entity. Andreas Büttner, Nana Göbel and Justus Wittich were elected onto the executive in November 1978, Günther Ziegenbein and Armin Scholter withdrew. The association was renamed “Freunde der Erziehungskunst Rudolf Steiners” (Friends of the Art of Education of Rudolf Steiner). Under the guidance of the new executive, the international support and networking activity was built up, amongst others with the newly founded International Aid Fund.

In 1994, the Friends were invited by UNESCO to attend the International Education Conference in Geneva in order to present Waldorf Education before an international public. This co-work with UNESCO continued and in May 2001 the Friends of Waldorf Education established official relations with UNESCO.

Today the association employs about 90 co-workers and has two branches, one in Berlin and another in Karlsruhe.

In the executive of the association are Nana Göbel, Bernd Ruf, Henning Kullak-Ublick and Andreas Schubert.

== Areas of work ==
The work of the Friends consists of different areas of activity, all of which stand in relation to and serve Waldorf education.

=== Project support/International Aid Fund ===
The Friends support Waldorf schools, Waldorf kindergartens, and anthroposophical Special education organisations throughout the world through donations but also through counselling, networking, mentoring etc. The association has no capital of its own, is thus not a foundation, but receives donations and legacies from many individual donors, from Waldorf schools and other institutions and from foundations connected with it. These it uses in accordance with the wishes of the donors, for it is important for the Friends that the donors themselves decide who or what they wish to support.

95% of all donations received by the Friends are for a specific, pre-defined purpose. The donors support institutions to which they themselves have a relationship, because of a report they have read or some other personal reason.

In order to support essential larger investments, the Friends work together with foundations and other aid funds, as well as with the BMZ (Federal Ministry of Economic Cooperation and Development).

=== Voluntary services ===
Since 1993 the Friends have promoted and organised international voluntary services.

Volunteers work in Waldorf educational or anthroposophically oriented institutions, communities (of persons with and without disability), schools, nursery schools and social projects.

A year of social service abroad can be arranged with the Friends through the following (German) state funded programmes:

- Internationaler Jugendfreiwilligendienst (IJFD)
- Entwicklungspolitischer Freiwilligendienst
- Anderer Dienst im Ausland (ADiA)

The Friends are certified for this international social service work with the Quifd Quality Seal Quifd-Gütesiegel (Qualität im Freiwilligendienst).

From 2011, the association offers voluntary services within Germany itself.

- Bundesfreiwilligendienst (BFD)
- Freiwilliges Soziales Jahr (FSJ)

In 2006 the Friends were authorised to offer a year of social service to international volunteers in Germany. This “incoming” programme has been incorporated into the State Voluntary Services since 2011.

=== Educational Godparenting ===
At the end of the 1990s the organisation of educational godparents was taken up as a new area of engagement in order to enable individual children in countries where Waldorf schools receive no state funding, having therefore to rely entirely on fee income, to nevertheless attend a Waldorf school.

Godparents constitute a quite individual form of assistance. Waldorf schools have from the beginning been dedicated and open to all human beings and classes of society. It should not depend on the economic situation of the parents whether a child is able to attend a Waldorf school or not. In this manner, the godparents support the individual child and also the whole school community.

Thus far the association has organised around 700 godparents. These support the equivalent number of children at over 50 schools with amounts ranging between 25 and 200 Euros per month.

=== WOW-Day ===
From 1994 on, students have engaged themselves on one day of the year for Waldorf initiatives the world over. By means of artistic endeavours or day jobs, they collect money for Waldorf institutions and projects that are in need of financial assistance.

With the help of the Friends and their partner organisations, the Bund der Freien Waldorfschulen and the European Council for Steiner Waldorf Education, the student campaign has grown from year to year. Students learn to become engaged on behalf of others and to take an interest in other cultural environments, as well as experiencing how to organise community events and transform their ideas into reality.

Over 200 Waldorf schools participate each year in more than 30 countries on a commonly agreed day in Autumn.

Around 2.5 million Euros have been collected by students on the WOW-Days since 1994 (2013) and have supported over 100 organisations worldwide.

Collected donations are first paid into the account of the Friends of Waldorf Education, who undertake to transfer 100% of the amount on to the projects.

=== Crisis or emergency education ===
Emergency or crisis education concerns itself with the psychological stabilising of children and young people in warfare and the aftermaths of natural catastrophes. To date, over 25 engagements have taken place in nine countries.

Curative teacher Bernd Ruf developed a comprehensive concept based on the insights of Waldorf education for this Emergency education after he had experienced the results of trauma on children in a refugee camp in Beirut during the war in Lebanon in 2006. Following on armed conflicts and natural catastrophes the Friends have thus far worked in Lebanon (2006, 2013), China (2008, 2013), Gaza (2009 – 2013), Indonesia (2009), Haiti (2010), Kirgistan (2010), Japan (2011), and Kenya (2012, 2013). They are members of the aid organisation Aktion Deutschland Hilft (ADH) and work in cooperation with partners such as the organisation Habitat for Humanity in Chile.

== Literature ==
- Bernd Ruf: Trümmer und Traumata: Anthroposophische Grundlagen notfallpädagogischer Einsätze Ita-Wegmann-Institut, 2012, ISBN 3905919397, 9783905919394.
