= Emanuil Ungureanu Technical College =

- Colegiul Tehnic „Emanuil Ungureanu”
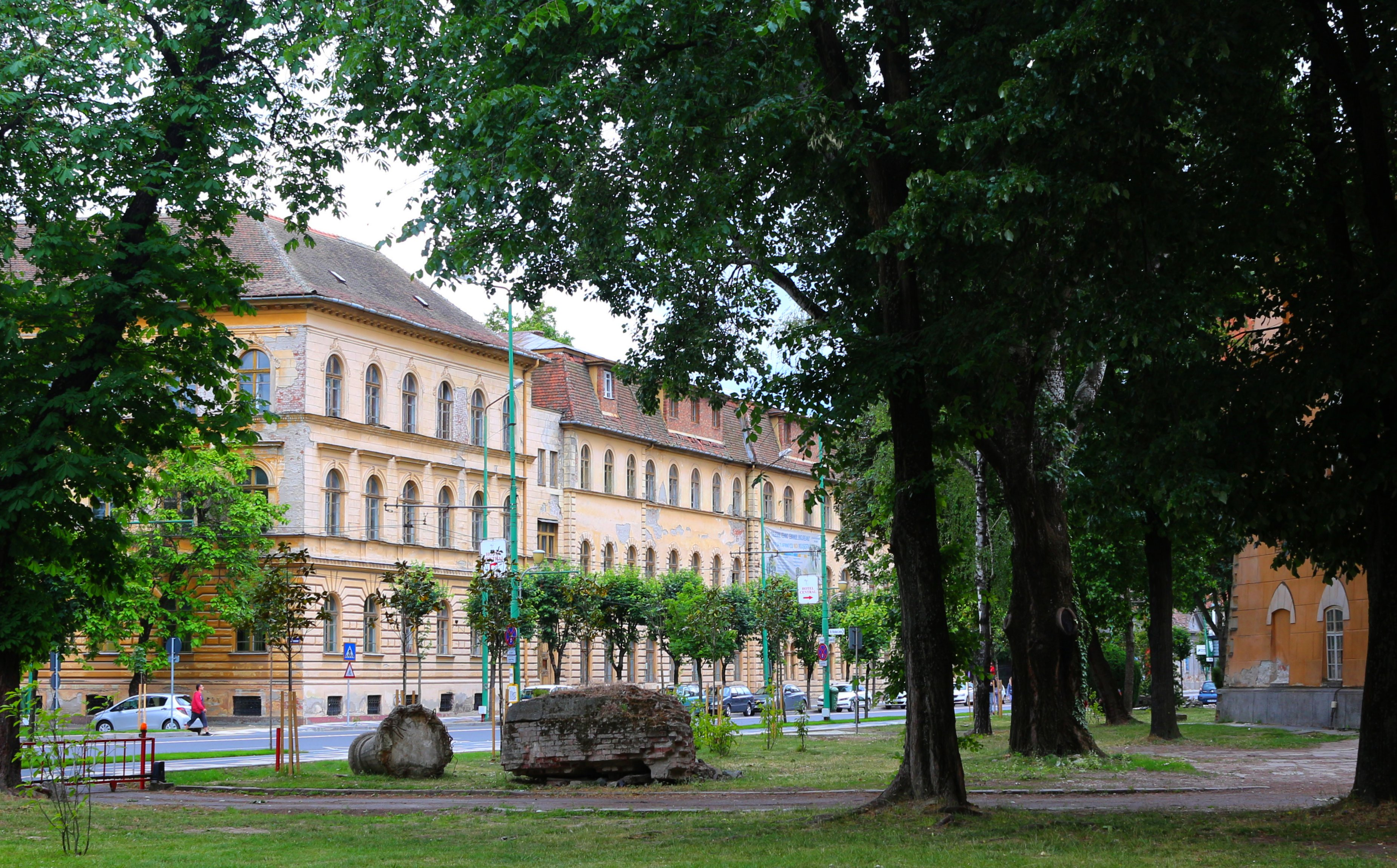

Location
- 3 John Hunyadi Square; Timișoara, Timiș County; Romania; 45°45′7″N 21°13′41″E

Information
- School type: Public, technical high school
- Established: 1879; 147 years ago
- Authority: Ministry of National Education
- Principal: Adina Mioc
- Enrollment: 900
- Language: Romanian
- Website: eungureanu.ro

Emanuil Ungureanu Technical College (Romanian: Colegiul Tehnic „Emanuil Ungureanu”) is a technical high school in Timișoara, Romania. The school is named after Emanuil Ungureanu, a lawyer educated in Budapest, philanthropist, and politician who actively supported education and culture. He generously donated his wealth to fund the construction of the Orthodox Church in Iosefin, the Metropolitan Cathedral, and the National House of Education.

== History ==
The city's industrial development led to a growing demand for vocational education, particularly among those aspiring to join the emerging bourgeoisie—a trend that had been taking shape since the 18th century. Although a School of Arts and Crafts had been established in Timișoara in 1879, the increasing number of applicants soon outgrew its capacity. In response, construction of a new, purpose-built school began in 1899. Designed by Albert Vigh and built by renowned Timișoara entrepreneur Eduard Reiter, the building was completed a year later. Notably, it was the first structure erected on the site of the former fortress walls and bastions near Hunyadi Castle, which had been recently demolished.

The former city trade school, now known as the Emanuil Ungureanu Technical College, features a classical-style façade with an entrance distinguished by three arches. The ground floor is accentuated by masonry bossages, while the two upper floors are adorned with pilasters topped with Corinthian capitals. Inside, spacious and well-lit rooms were designed, including classrooms, essential workshops, and numerous additional facilities. The monumental fresco in the ceremonial hall, measuring 15 meters long and 4 meters wide, was painted by Ştefan Szönyi and later restored in the 1980s by the artist Viorel Ţigu. The school officially opened on 1 September 1900, with the Hungarian Minister of Education in attendance, and quickly became invaluable to the city as the number of apprentices grew steadily each year.

During the interwar period, the school operated as the only arts and crafts institution in the region, training craftsmen for the entire Banat province. In 1942, it was reclassified as an industrial high school. In 1940, the school accommodated 102 refugee students from Oradea, Satu Mare, Baia Mare, and Târgu Mureş, and between 1940 and 1942, it also served as the site of an anti-fascist camp. Under the communist regime, the school was transformed into a technical secondary school specializing in electroenergy and electrotechnics. In 1958, it was renamed the Electromotor School, and in 1975, it reverted to an industrial high school while retaining the same name.
