= Embassy of France, Bucharest =

Coordinates: 44.4451°N 26.0949°E

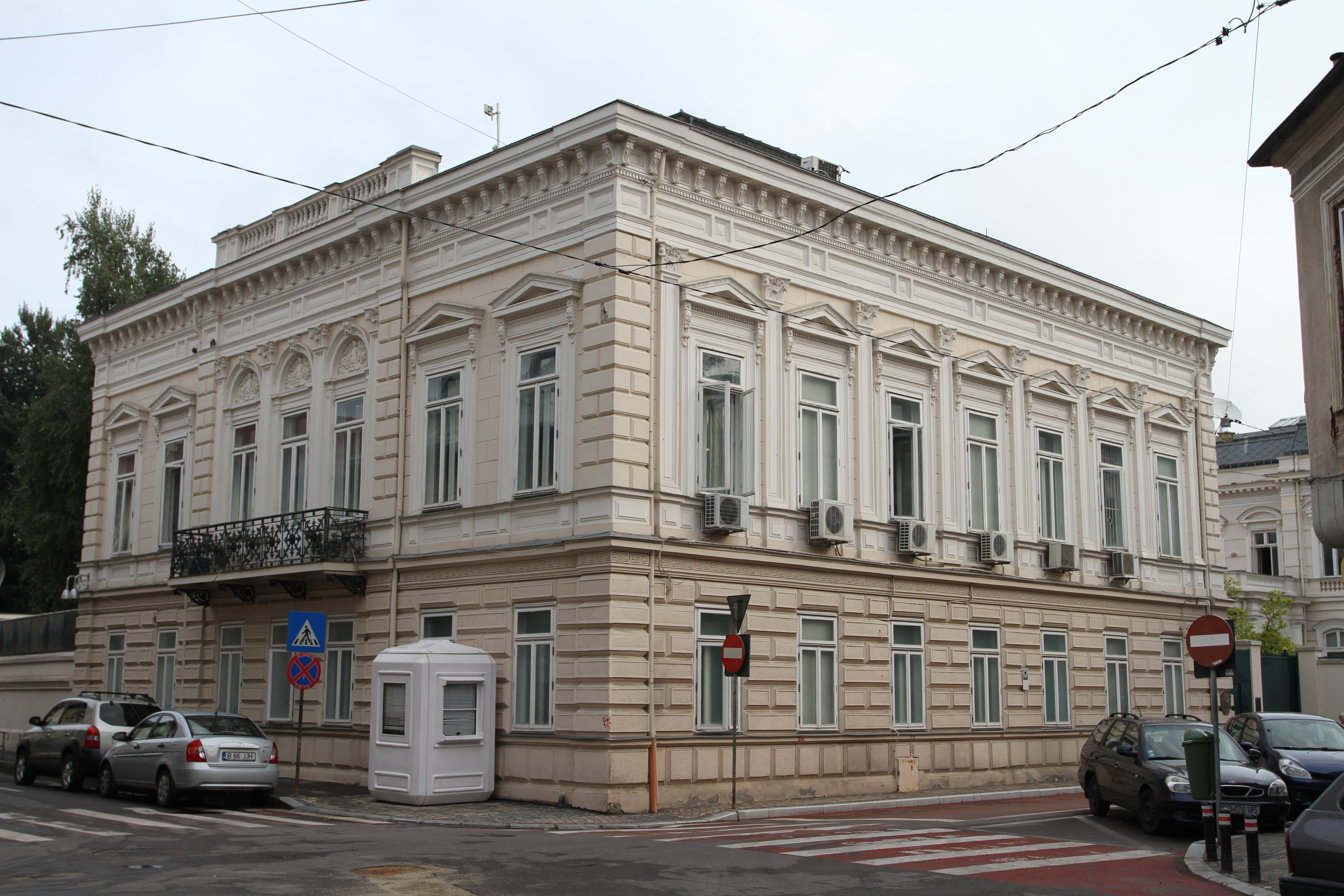
French embassy in Bucharest

The embassy logo

The Embassy of France in Bucharest is the diplomatic mission of the French Republic in Romania.

Located at 13-15 Biserica Amzei Street, the building dates to 1889–1890. It is listed as a historic monument by Romania's Ministry of Culture and Religious Affairs.

== See also ==
- France–Romania relations
