= Banat National College =

Banat National College Colegiul Național Bănățean
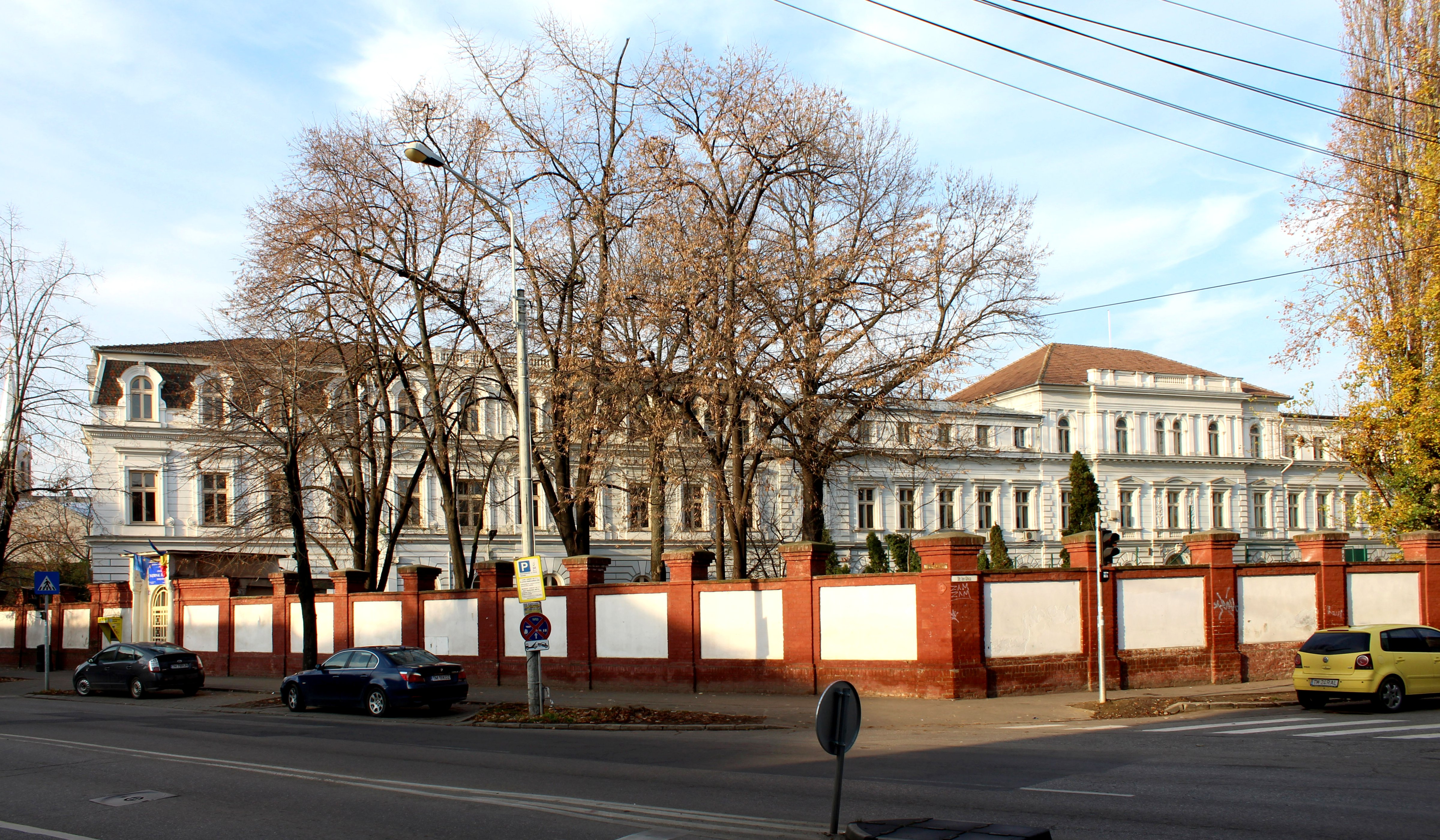

Location
- 26 16 December 1989 Boulevard, Timișoara
- Coordinates: 45°44′40″N 21°12′47″E

Information
- Type: High school
- Authority: Ministry of National Education
- Principal: Alexandru Tanasie
- Staff: 196 (2019/2020)
- Enrollment: 2,448 (2019/2020)
- Language: Romanian, German
- Color(s): Red and dark blue
- Website: www.colegiulbanatean.ro

Banat National College is one of the most prestigious high schools in Timișoara. It was certified "European school" by the Ministry of Education in 2004. The college buildings are part of the complex that belonged to the School Sisters of Notre Dame, which also owned the Notre Dame Church in Timișoara. Currently, this complex is part of the old Iosefin district, inscribed in the list of historical monuments with the code TM-II-s-B-06098.

== History ==
The building of the Banat National College has housed educational institutions since its establishment. Between 1773 and 1880, Trivium Elementary School functioned here. Between 1881 and 1890, in parallel with the Elementary School, the Notre Dame Sisters' School also functioned here. Between 1890 and 1924, the old elementary school was abandoned, and the new Catholic school expanded its perimeter, adding the wing from the current General Ion Dragalina Boulevard. In 1924, the Notre Dame Sisters' School expanded its scope of activity, establishing the Queen Marie Housekeeping School. In 1931, with the establishment of high school courses, the institution became the Notre Dame Roman Catholic High School for Girls. In 1946, the Queen Marie Housekeeping School changed its name to the Urban Housekeeping School, and later, in 1947, to the Housekeeping Technical School. With the educational reform of 1948, the Housekeeping Technical School became the Pedagogical School for Educators, and the Notre Dame Roman Catholic School for Girls became the Pedagogical School for Girls. In 1948 the section with teaching in Serbian was moved here, from the C.D. Loga High School; it was split off in 1990 with the establishment of the Serbian High School. In 1961 a German section and a Hungarian section were established. The first one still functions today, and the Hungarian one broke away with the establishment of the Béla Bartók High School. It got its current name in 1999.

The building where the college functions is a historical monument. It was built in 1881 in historicist style according to the plans of architect Eduard Reiter. It is currently owned by the Timișoara City Hall, having been bought in 2023 from the Roman Catholic Diocese.

== Students ==
At the beginning of the 2019–2020 school year, at the Banat National College, a number of 2,448 students were distributed in 89 classes:

- primary school – 35 classes (912 students);
- middle school – 22 classes (655 students);
- secondary school – 32 classes (881 students).
