= Francesco Saverio Nitti Economic College =

- Colegiul Economic „Francesco Saverio Nitti”

Location
- Strada Corbului, Nr. 7C; Timișoara, Timiș County; Romania
- Coordinates: 45°44′28″N 21°13′12″E

Information
- Type: Economic high school
- Established: 1895; 131 years ago
- Authority: Ministry of National Education
- Principal: Florina Spălățelu
- Faculty: 57 (2018/2019)
- Enrollment: 798 (2018/2019)
- Language: Romanian
- Website: www.fsnitti.ro

Francesco Saverio Nitti Economic College (Romanian: Colegiul Economic „Francesco Saverio Nitti”) is a high school with an economic profile located at 7C Corbului Street, Timișoara, Romania. Founded in 1895, it is named after Italian economist Francesco Saverio Nitti.

== History ==
The first elementary school of commerce in Timișoara – Comercial Lehrkurs – was founded in 1838 by Franz Stirber and was a private school with German as the language of instruction and with a one-year study programme; Timișoara thus became the third city in the Habsburg Empire to have a commercial school, after Vienna and Budapest. In 1895, in place of the elementary school of commerce, a three-year higher school of commerce was established, which from the school year 1899–1900 will have Hungarian as the language of instruction. In 1900, this school will become the property of the City Hall.

In 1919, after the installation of the Romanian authorities in the local administration (instead of the Hungarian ones), on 14 December, the opening ceremony of the courses of the Higher School of Commerce took place, which had three sections – Romanian, German and Hungarian. By 1924–1925, the Higher School of Commerce remained with the Romanian and German sections, the students from the Hungarian section being gradually "absorbed" by confessional schools (or classes) with an economic-commercial profile in Timișoara, such as the Reformed, Roman Catholic or Israelite school. Over time, the high school has had various names: Prince Carol Commercial High School (1936–1944), Boys' Commercial High School (1937–1949) and Technical School of Administration, Economics and Finance (1951–1955). During this period, the courses were held in the current City Hall building.

Between 1955 and 1966, no high-profile economic school operated in Timișoara. In 1966, the Economic High School was re-established on the current site of the college. In 1987 the high school merged with the High School of Public Alimentation and the vocational school, which had functioned independently between 1972 and 1987, becoming the Economic School Group. In 1994, following a twinning agreement with the Istituto di Istruzione Superiore "Francesco Saverio Nitti" from Potenza, the Ministry of National Education approved that the Economic School Group from Timișoara be named after the Italian economist Francesco Saverio Nitti. Since 2000, the F.S. Nitti Economic School Group became the F.S. Nitti Economic College.
