= Béla Bartók High School =

High school in Timișoara, Romania

Béla Bartók Theoretical High School
- Bartók Béla Elméleti Líceum
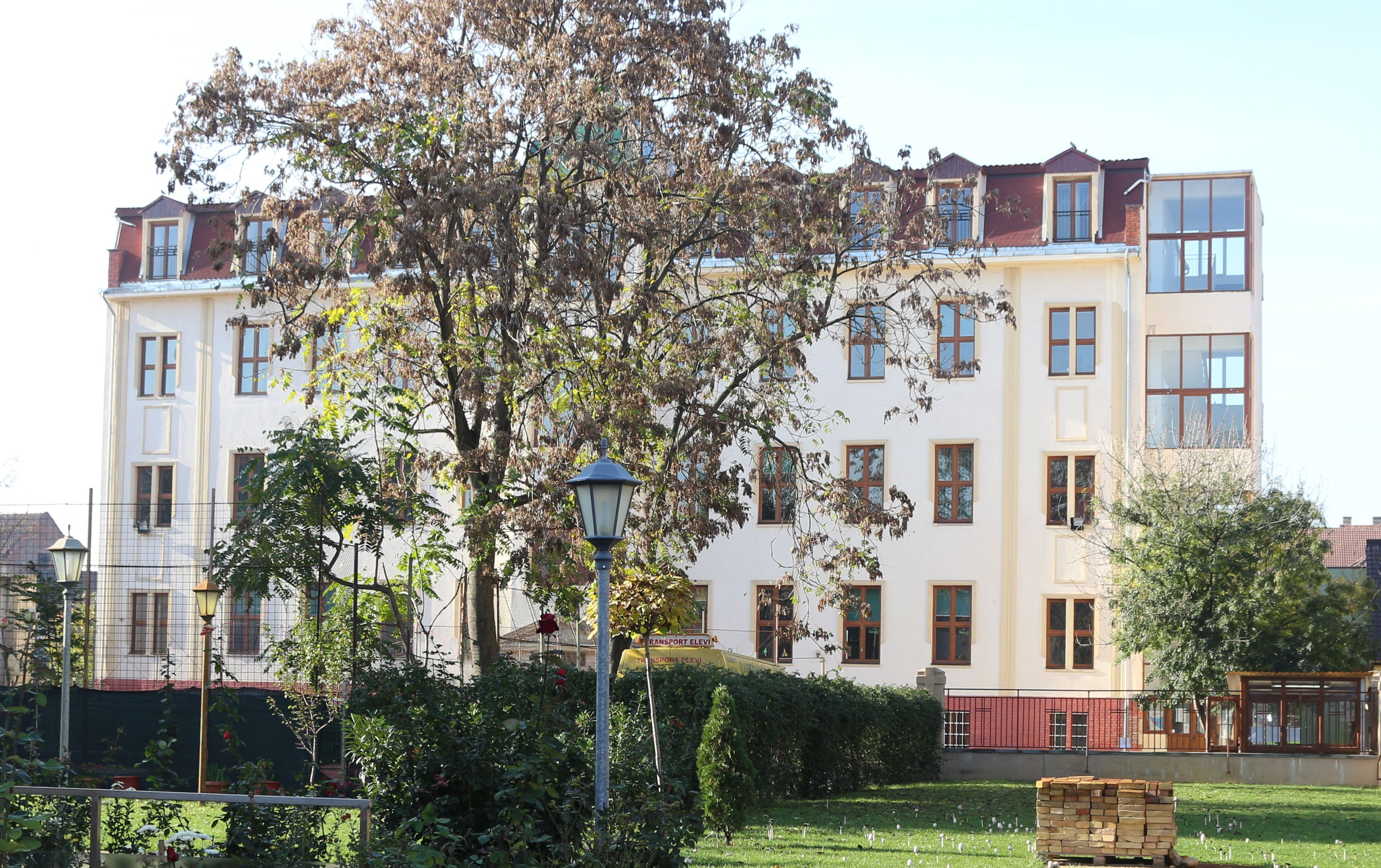

Location
- Bulevardul General Ion Dragalina, Nr. 11A; Timișoara, Timiș County; Romania
- Coordinates: 45°44′39″N 21°12′39″E

Information
- Type: Theoretical high school
- Established: 1932; 93 years ago
- Authority: Ministry of National Education
- Principal: Ildikó Erdei
- Staff: 75 (2021/2022)
- Enrollment: 626 (2021/2022)
- Language: Hungarian
- Website: www.bartok.ro

Béla Bartók Theoretical High School (Hungarian: Bartók Béla Elméleti Líceum; Romanian: Liceul Teoretic „Béla Bartók”) is a Hungarian-language high school located at 11A General Ion Dragalina Boulevard, Timișoara, Romania.

== History ==
The building of the current high school was designed in 1932 by architect László Székely as a confessional school of the Roman Catholic church in Iosefin. After the education reform of 1948, the building was expropriated, and a Hungarian-language county education center was established in the building, which was abolished in 1956. It was not until 1971 that it was reconstituted as a high school of mathematics and physics in Hungarian. In the 1980s the communists tried to eliminate the national specificity by introducing the Romanian classes. After 1990 it became a theoretical high school and was given the name Béla Bartók, after Sânnicolau Mare-born composer and pianist.

== Students ==
As of 2021–2022, the institution includes three kindergarten groups, 10 primary school classes, 8 middle school classes and 12 high school classes, totaling 626 students. The high school classes have four accredited specializations:

- mathematics and computer science (real profile);
- natural sciences (real profile);
- social sciences (humanist profile);
- technician in economic activities (service profile).

Over 30% of its students come from families where Hungarian is not spoken.
