= Bessarabov =

Bessarabov feminine Bessarabova is a Russian-language patronymic surname literally meaning "son of Bessarab", i.e., "son of a person of Bessarabian origin". Notable people with the surname include:

- Oleksiy Bessarabov
- Daniil Bessarabov
- Irina Bessarabova (1961–2018), Russian film director, actress, and poetess

== See also ==
- Bessarab
- Basarab
