= Traian Doda =

Austro-Hungarian major general of Romanian ethnicity (1822–1895)

Generalmajor Traian Doda
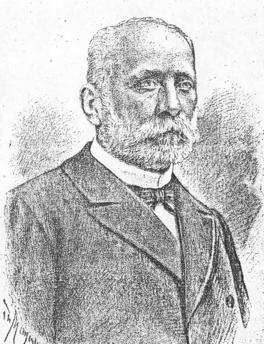

Member of the National Assembly of Hungary
- In office 23 January 1874 – 24 May 1875
- In office 30 August 1875 – 29 June 1878
- In office 19 October 1878 – 1 June 1881
- In office 26 September 1881 – 19 May 1884
- In office 27 September 1884 – 25 May 1887
- In office 28 September 1887 – 11 January 1888

Personal details
- Born: 14 July 1822 Rudăria or Prilipeț, Banat Military Frontier, Austrian Empire (present-day Caraș-Severin County, Romania)
- Died: 16 July 1895 (aged 73) Caransebeș, Austria-Hungary (present-day Romania)
- Party: Romanian National Party in Transylvania and Banat
- Profession: Officer

Military service
- Allegiance: Austrian Empire; Austria-Hungary
- Branch/service: Imperial Austrian Army; Austro-Hungarian Army
- Rank: Generalmajor
- Commands: Venice; General Command in Zagreb; 12th k.u.k. Infantry Brigade in Kraków
- Battles/wars: First Italian War of Independence; Hungarian Revolution of 1848

Traian Doda (in German: Trajan Doda, 14 July 1822 – 16 July 1895) was an ethnic Romanian military officer in the Austro-Hungarian Army who rose to the rank of Major General, and later served as a prominent politician and member of the Diet of Hungary. He played a central role in the political emancipation and cultural rights movement of Banat Romanians during the late 19th century.

== Early life and education ==
Doda was born in Prilipeț or Rudăria, Austrian Empire (present-day Caraș-Severin County, Romania), into a family of peasant border guards. He was of Aromanian descent. His father, also named Traian, was a sergeant in the Vlach-Illyrian Military Frontier Regiment and raised silkworms. He was a close relative of General Nicolae Cena.

Doda received his early education in Prilipeț, Mehadia, and Caransebeș before pursuing formal military education at the Theresian Military Academy in Wiener Neustadt. Fluent in six languages, he maintained strong ties to his native region throughout his life.

== Military career ==
In 1842, Doda was appointed lieutenant in the Banat Military Frontier Regiment No. 13 and spent three years directing the mathematical educational institute in Caransebeș.

During the Revolutions of 1848, Doda saw extensive action across the Habsburg realm:

- Italian Campaign (1848): Participating in the Siege of Venice, he led an outpost action at Cava Zuccherina. On 6 November at Cavallino, his unit captured 50 enemy combatants and an enemy vessel. Following this success, he was promoted to captain.
- Hungarian Revolution (1848–1849): Reassigned to Banat, he was severely wounded at the Battle of Reșița. In January 1849, he served as a staff officer under Major General Franz von Gläser. During the Battle of Arad on 8 February 1849, Doda disregarded existing orders out of tactical necessity and maneuvered four rocket artillery cannons across the frozen Mureș River. His counterattack pushed back enemy forces and relieved two surrounded detachments of the Leiningen 2nd Battalion. He subsequently commanded three supply columns to Arad with high efficiency, earning the Military Merit Cross with War Decoration and an official citation of satisfaction from Emperor Franz Joseph I.
- Transylvanian Campaign (1849): Under General Count Eduard Clam-Gallas, Doda helped develop strategic maneuvers for the occupation of Transylvania, taking part in battles at Ilieni (Illyefalva) on 23 July and Bixad (Bükszád) on 1 August.

=== Staff and command appointments ===
- 1 December 1857: Promoted to major in the St. George Military Frontier Regiment No. 65 in Varaždin, later transferred to the General Staff's division for troop management and logistics.
- 18 August 1860: Advanced to lieutenant colonel and head of section.
- 1864: Promoted to colonel in Military Frontier Regiment No. 2 and appointed garrison commander for Venice.
- 20 November 1866: Named Chief of Staff of the General Command in Zagreb. He later commanded brigade-level components of the 13th and 22nd Infantry Divisions.
- 30 April 1870: Promoted to Major General (Generalmajor) with rank effective 11 May 1870, taking command of the 12th k.u.k. Infantry Brigade in Kraków. He officially retired from active military service on 1 November 1872.

In 1877, Prince Carol of Romania invited him to command the Romanian Army in the Romanian War of Independence but, as an Austro-Hungarian general, due to complicated geopolitics and loyalty towards the Habsburg Monarchy, he respectfully refused.

== Political career and activism ==
Following his retirement from the army, Doda settled in Caransebeș and dedicated his efforts to civil rights and education for the Romanian population of Banat.

Following the dissolution of the Banat Military Frontier, he advocated for the creation of the Community of Wealth (Comunitatea de Avere), an institution established to manage former communal border patrol assets for public benefit, and was elected as its first president on 19 December 1879.

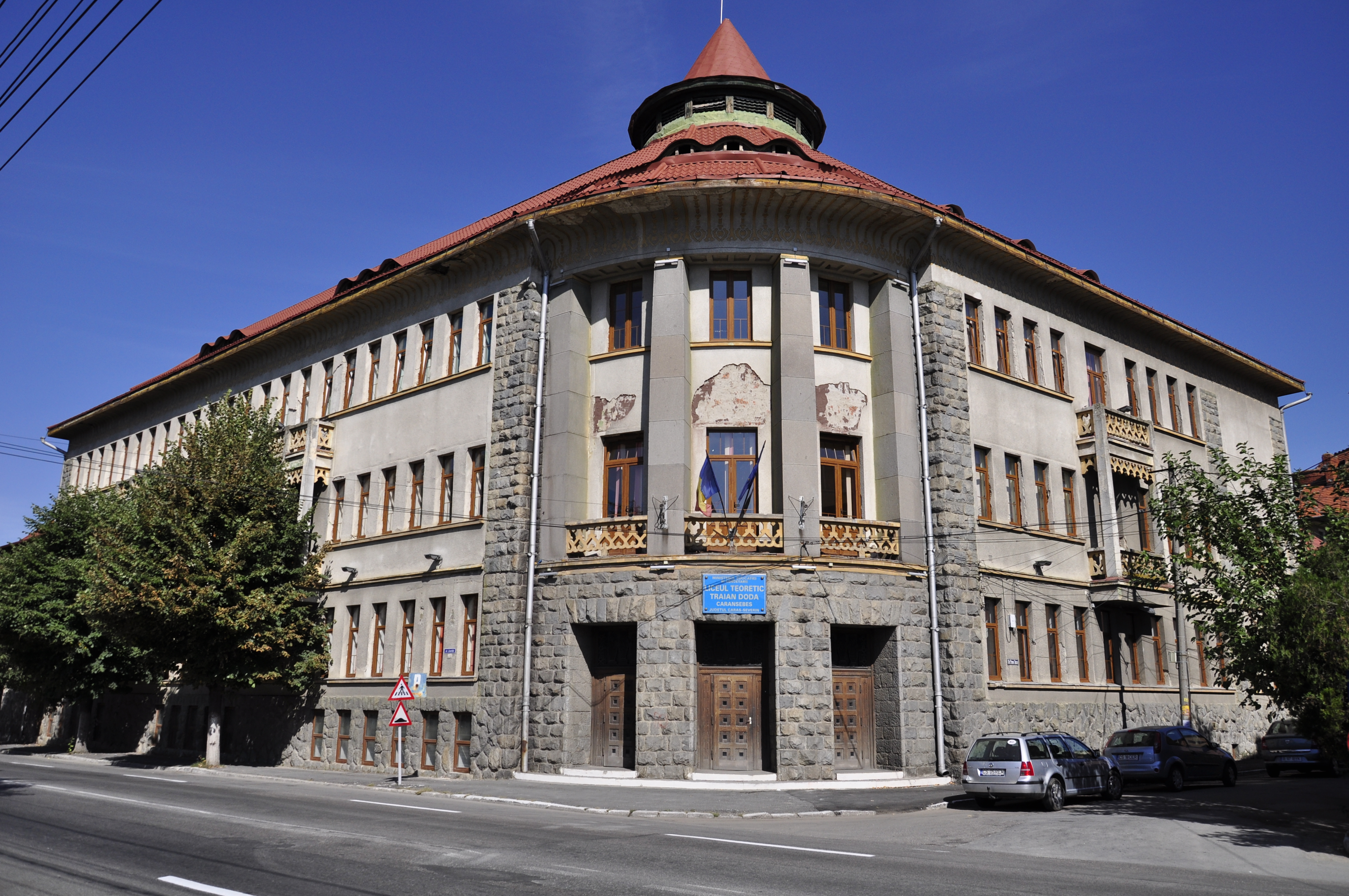
Traian Doda National College in Caransebeș

He repeatedly lobbied Austrian and Hungarian authorities to establish a trade school in Bozovici and a Romanian-language high school in Caransebeș. While Hungarian administrative opposition prevented the high school's founding during his lifetime, the institution was formally inaugurated in 1919 and today bears his name.

=== Diet of Hungary ===
On 10 January 1874, Doda was elected to the Diet of Hungary in Budapest, a position to which he was re-elected five consecutive times through 1887. Alongside Vincențiu Babeș, he emerged as one of the prominent political voices defending the national, educational, and cultural rights of Romanians in Transylvania and Banat.

His positions frequently drew intense hostility from Hungarian nationalists. During an electoral rally in Caransebeș in October 1875, nationalist opponents publicly demanded his immediate arrest by state prosecutors for his political rhetoric.

=== Indictment and retirement ===
On 14 October 1887, Doda delivered an electoral speech advocating political self-determination for Romanians and condemning the administrative closure of Romanian-medium schools. On 17 September 1888, Hungarian judicial authorities in Arad indicted him for political agitation.

Doda relocated to Vienna during the proceedings and was tried in absentia, resulting in a sentence of two years' imprisonment and a fine of 2,000 korona. Emperor Franz Joseph I subsequently granted him an imperial pardon. Shortly after the trial, Doda suffered a stroke, forcing his full retirement from public life.

== Death and legacy ==
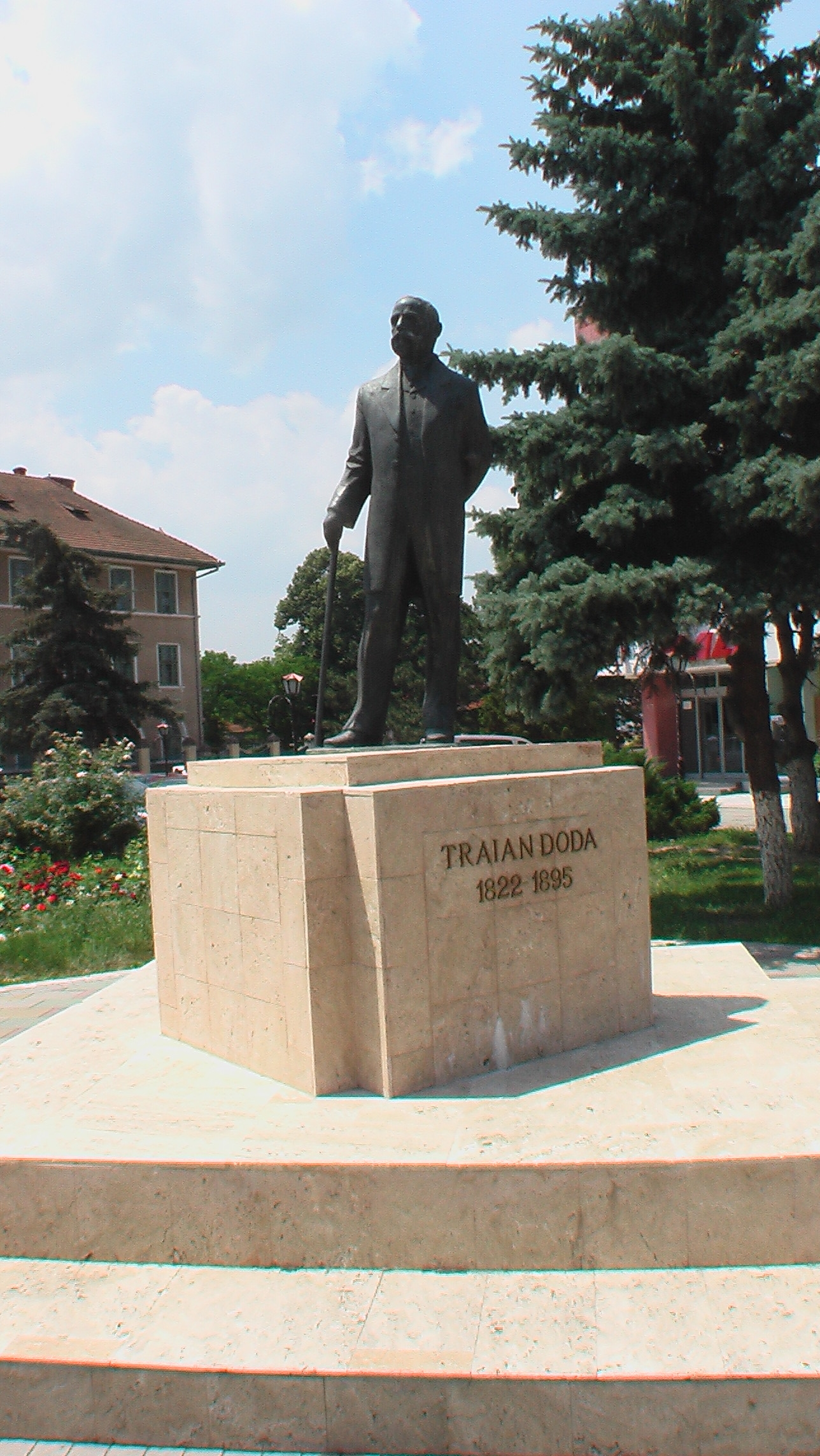
Statue of Traian Doda in Caransebeș

Traian Doda died on 16 July 1895 in Caransebeș at the age of 73. His funeral attracted thousands of mourners from across the region, with the service led by Bishop Nicolae Popea of Caransebeș.

He was buried in the Caransebeș cemetery. His tombstone carries the inscription:

Dreptatea ți-a fost deviza, luptând pentru ea te-ai stins
("Justice was your motto; fighting for it, you passed away")

== See also ==
- Leonidas von Popp
