= Basarabă of Caransebeș family =

Romanian noble family from Banat

Basarabă of Caransebeș: Bazaraba de Karansebes (Latin); karánsebesi Baszaraba (Hungarian)
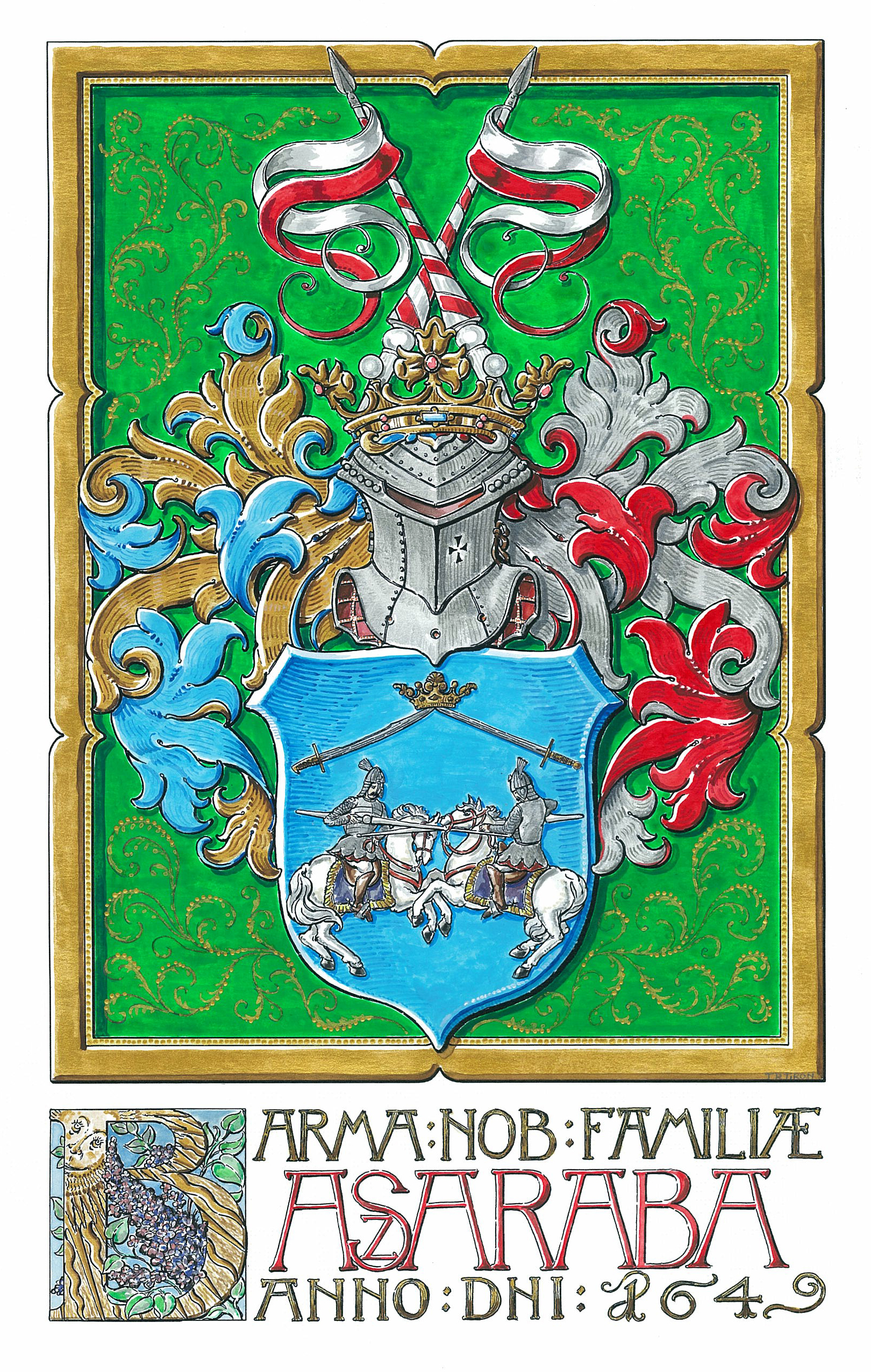
- Country: Principality of Transylvania
- Current region: Romania (Romania); Hungary
- Etymology: From Cuman: basar (to rule) + aba (father)
- Seat: Caransebeș; Lugoj
- Titles: Viceban of Lugoj and Caransebeș; Ispán of Severin; Castellan of Caransebeș
- Connected families: Csérényi of Blajfalăul de Jos; Fiat of Armeniș; Gârleșteanu of Uroi and Gârliște; Iojică of Brănișca; Kornis of Totvărădia; Lățug of Delinești; Marin of Caransebeș; Măcicaș of Tincova; Országh; Ostrovel; Peica of Caransebeș; Pobora of Zăvoi; Vaida of Caransebeș
- Estates: Bozovici; Bucoșnița; Borlova; Egrestelek
- Properties: Caransebeș; Lugoj

The Basarabă of Caransebeș family (Latin: Bazaraba de Karansebes, Hungarian: karánsebesi Baszaraba) was a Romanian noble family from what today is Banat, Romania, whose members held various positions in the administrative structure of the Banate of Lugoj and Caransebeș (Hungarian: Karánsebesi-Lugosi Bánság), part of the Principality of Transylvania (Hungarian: Érdelyi Fejedelmség) in the 16th and 17th centuries.

== Origins ==
Although there has been some speculation regarding a possible link between the Basarabă of Caransebeș family and the Basarab family that ruled over Wallachia, the Basarabs from Banat constantly appear in documents only starting with the 16th century, when the family was granted estates in the Land of Almăj (Hungarian: Almásividék), today in Caraș-Severin County, Romania, by the Prince of Transylvania. The family could have originated from the Land of Hațeg (Hungarian: Hátszegvidék), today in Hunedoara County, Romania, as implied by Bogdan Petriceicu-Hasdeu, with some arguments going in favour of his theory, since Banat is bordered by the Land of Hațeg, where the same surname is found with other noble families, such as Basarabă of Hunedoara (Hungarian: vajdahunyadi Baczarábai) in 1685, or Basarabă of Paroș (Hungarian: párosi Baszarába) in 1784.

== History ==
The first member of the family, a Ștefan (Latin: Stephanus) or Sebastian (Latin: Sebastianus) Basarabă is only mentioned in a document dated September 20, 1544, as one of the nobles in the Severin County (Latin: Comitatus Severinensis, Hungarian: Szörény vármegye).

The next generation is represented by Ioan (Latin: Ioannes, Hungarian: János) and Francisc (Latin: Franciscus, Hungarian: Ferencz) Basarabă of Caransebeș, who were either sons or nephews of the aforementioned Ștefan or Sebastian, with them being either brothers or cousins. Ioan was first mentioned in 1568, when he became the landowner of a land called Egrestelek, near today's Bănia and in 1598 also of parts of Bozovici, both in the Land of Almăj. He later served as Ispán of Severin, together with George Gârleșteanu of Rudăria (Hungarian: rudariai Gerlestyei György) in 1577 and Castellan of Caransebeș before his death in late 1596 or early 1597. He was married to Ana Peica of Caransebeș (Hungarian: karánsebesi Pejka Anna), who outlived him, and who was about nine when they were engaged, which would imply Ioan was married once before, with a first wife who died before 1588.

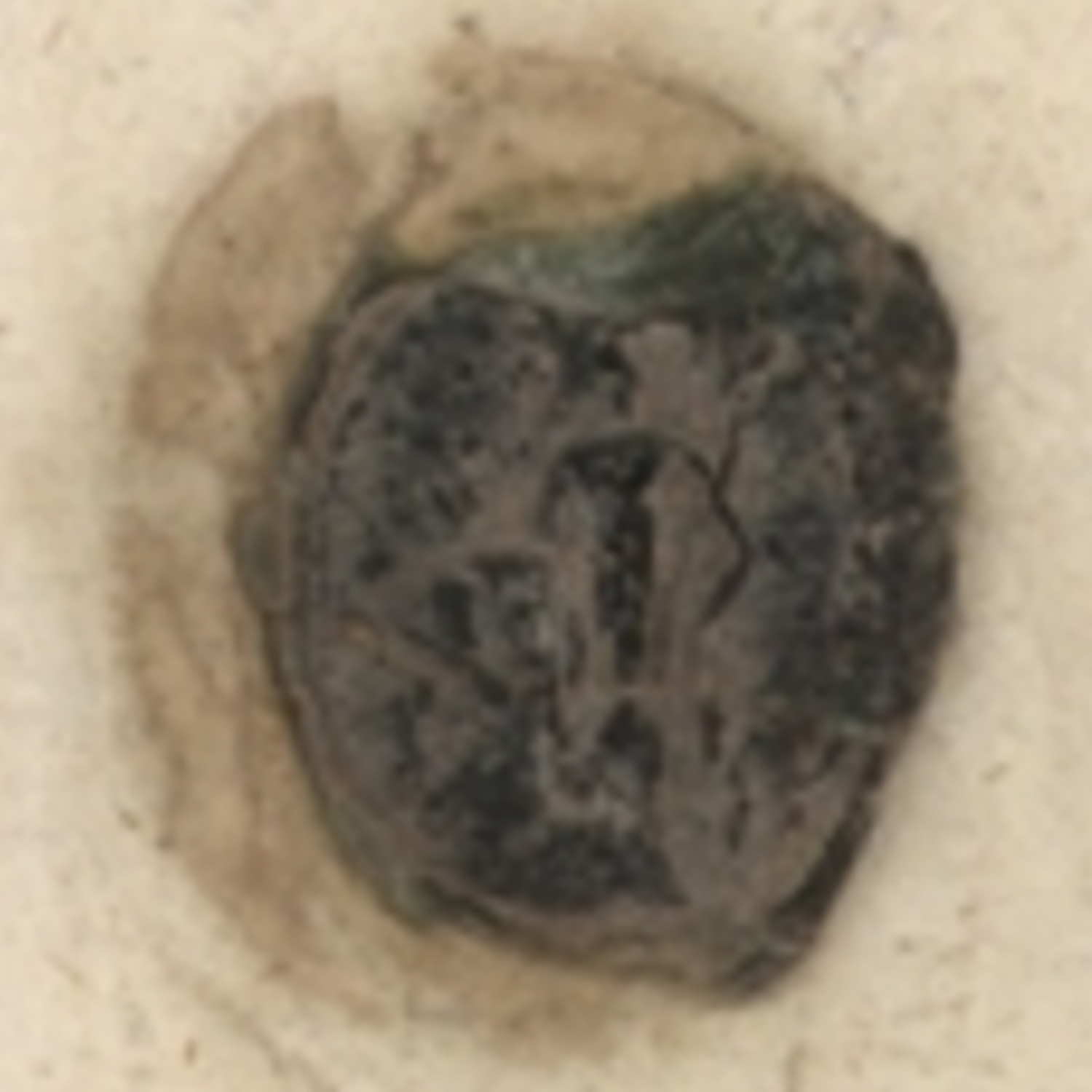
Seal of Francisc Basarabă of Caransebeș, 1577

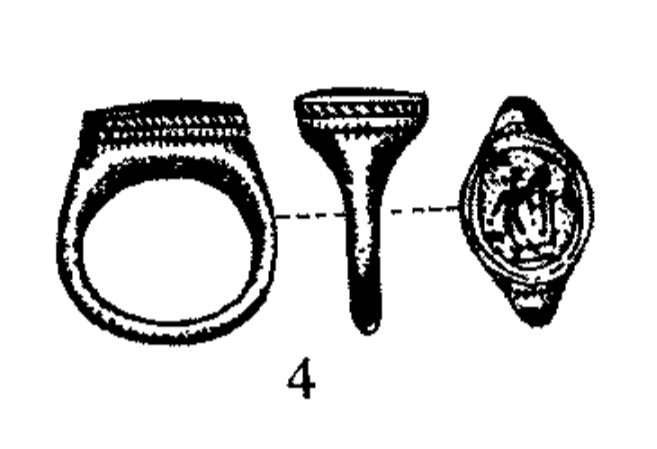
Possible cameo ring of Francisc Basarabă of Caransebeș found in one of the graves at the Franciscan Monastery of Caransebeș

The most prominent member of the family was Francisc, who was first mentioned on October 8, 1576, as Ispán of Severin and Castellan of Caransebeș, together with George Gârleșteanu of Rudăria. He held this position until at least 1598, usually together with other nobles from the county, such as the aforementioned George Gârleșteanu of Rudăria, from 1576 until 1581, Bonaventura Vaida of Caransebeș (Hungarian: karánsebesi Vajda Bonaventura), from 1581 until 1582, or Ladislau Peica of Caransebeș (Hungarian: karánsebesi Pejka László) in 1583. For a brief period of time in 1583, Francisc served as Viceban of Lugoj and Caransebeș. His main estates were in Bozovici and in Bucoșnița, but he also had one family of serfs who lived in Borlova. Francisc was married to Ana Vaida of Caransebeș (Hungarian: karánsebesi Vajda Anna), who also owned property in Caransebeș, namely a house on the Market Street. The family was, like much of the ruling elite at that time, Roman Catholic and had close ties to the Franciscan Monastery in Caransebeș. It is possible that Francisc was buried at that same monastery, as archeologists uncovered a cameo ring similar to the one that Francisc used as a personal seal. Although some historians argue that the Basarabs of Caransebeș became extinct with the passing of Ioan and Francisc, members of the family appear in documents throughout the 17th century, only this time in Lugoj. Thus, on February 20, 1649, Prince George Rákóczi II of Transylvania granted nobility and arms to 49 hussars from Lugoj's garrison, among which was also Mihail Basarabă (Latin: Michael Bazaraba, Hungarian: Baszaraba Mihály):

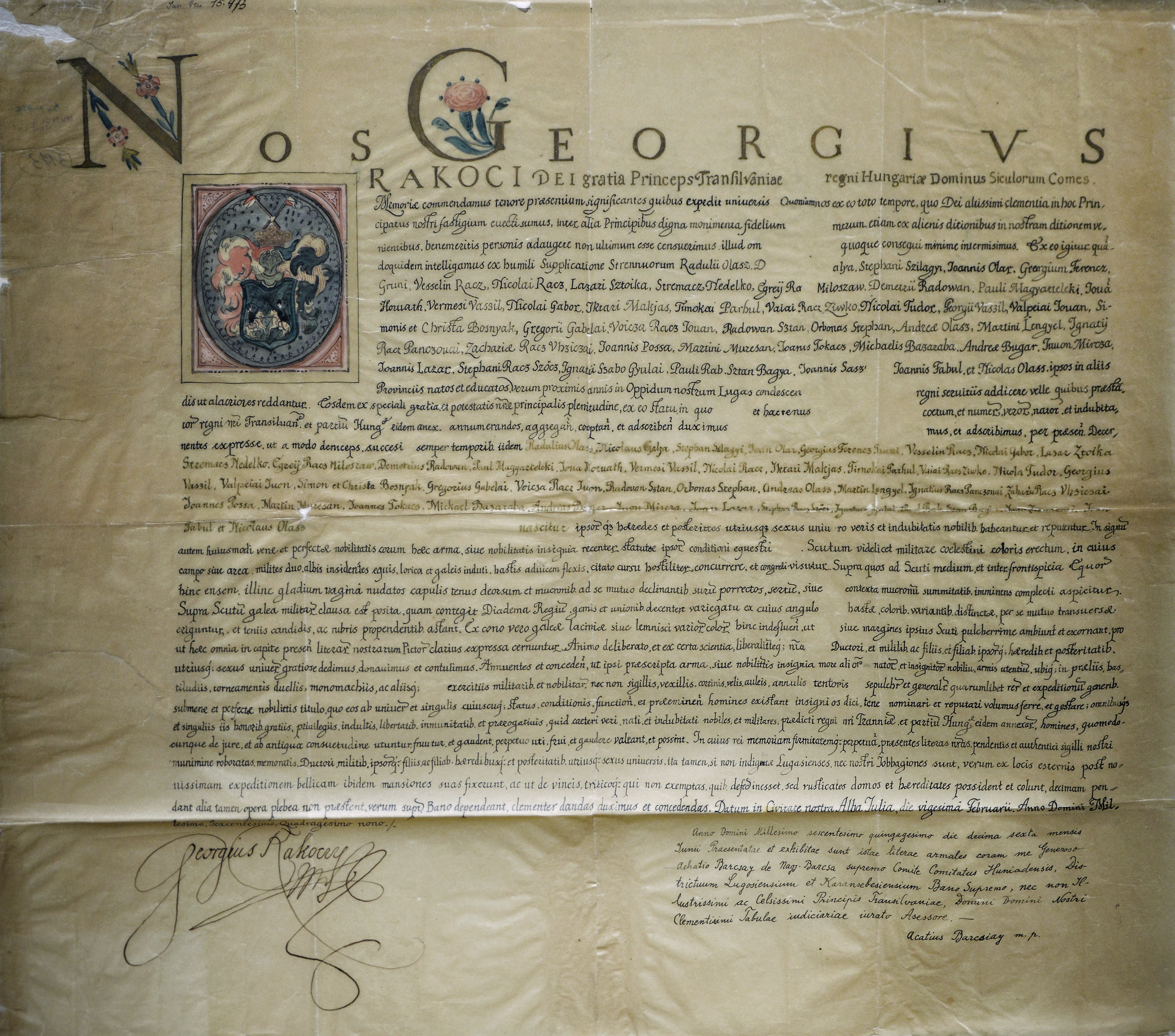
Period copy of the grant issued to 49 hussars from Lugoj's garrison, now at the National Union Museum of Alba Iuli

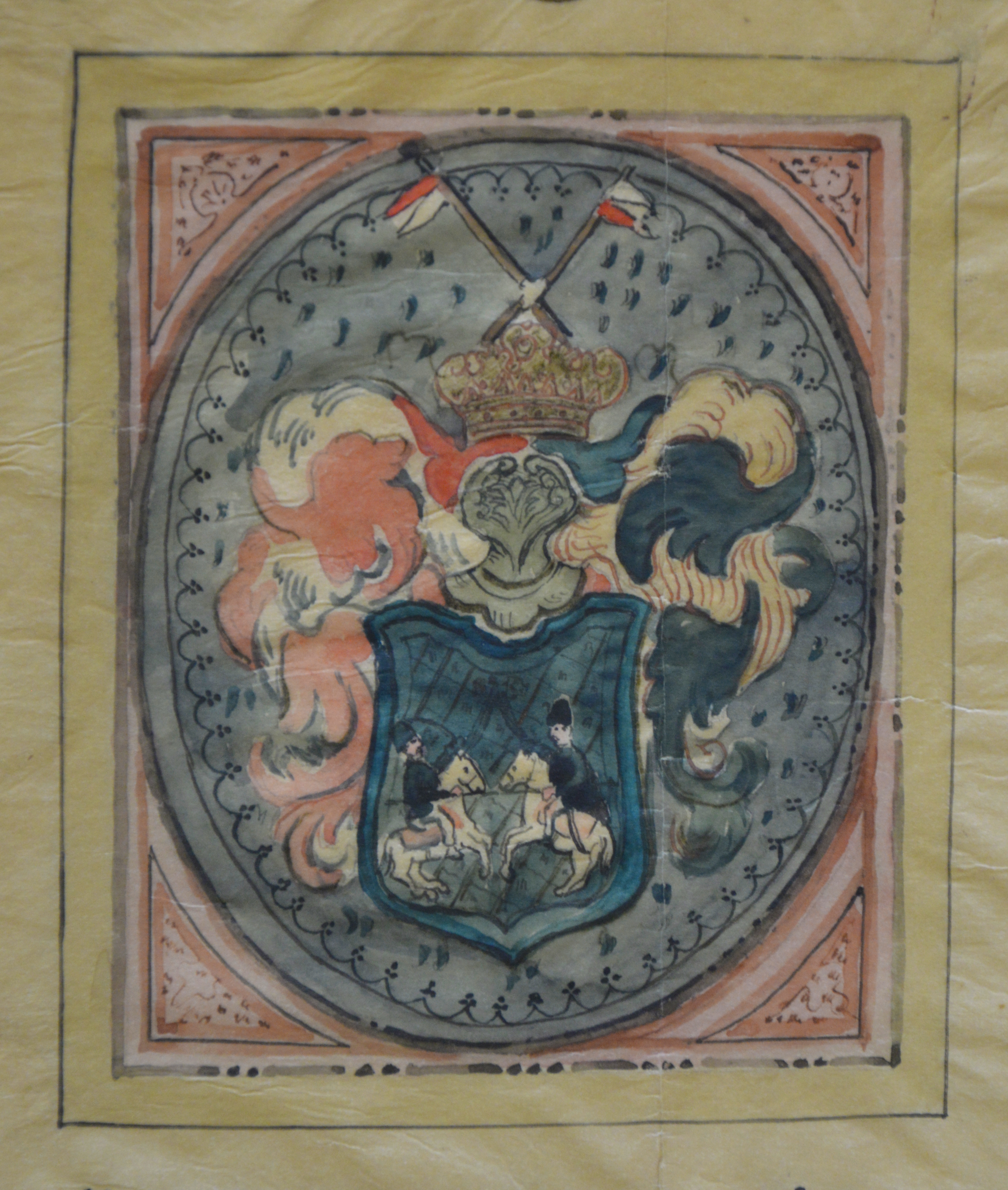
The coat of arms granted to 49 hussars from Lugoj's garrison

A celestine military shield, in the field of which are seen two soldiers on white horses, equipped with breastplates and helmets, each with lances pointing at the other, charging and fighting; above them, in the middle of the shield, between the horses' heads, a sword is seen on one side, and on the other a sabre, both drawn from their sheaths, with the hilts downwards, the blades apart, and the points joined under golden crown; above the shield is placed a closed military helmet, on which there is a royal crown, adorned with pearls, from the top of which two lances of different colours rise, crossing each other, and from which hang white and red pennants; from the top of the helmet, ribbons of various colours come down the sides of the shield.

In 1658, Prince Acathius Barcsay of Transylvania sold the Banate of Lugoj and Caransebeș to the Ottomans, in exchange for their support in gaining the throne. Thus, the banate became part of the Ottoman Province of Timișoara until 1688, when the Habsburg troops led by General Friedrich, Count Veterani of Urbino managed to conquer most of the Banathian territories. In this context, the descendants of the former noble families of the Banate of Lugoj and Caransebeș petitioned Leopold I, Holy Roman Emperor, asking the monarch to grant them their old privileges and the right to freely elect a ban. One of the signatories was Martin Basarabă (Latin: Martinus Bazaraba, Hungarian: Baszaraba Martón). Martin was mentioned as one of the nobles of Lugoj in 1698, a year before the territory of the former banate will again become part of the Ottoman Sultanate with the Treaty of Carloviț.

During the wars between the Habsburgs and the Ottomans, with Banat as a fighting ground, passing from one administration to the other, the power of the local nobles slowly diminished. After the Ottoman conquest, all of the land became the private property of the sultan, and the nobility either fled to Transylvania, or remained on their former estates, slowly mixing with the local peasantry. After the land was conquered by the Habsburgs, it was reorganized into the Banate of Timișoara, also becoming a personal property of the monarch. Thus, the old ruling elite, now without privileges, either remained in Transylvania or continued living as simple citizens.

In the 18th century, some members of the family were enlisted in the military forces of the Banat Military Frontier, such as Ioan Basarabă (German: Ianos Basaraba), mentioned in 1795, during an expedition in the Land of Hațeg.

== Genealogy ==
The wife of Ioan Basarabă, Ana Peica, was probably the daughter of Ioan Peica of Caransebeș (Hungarian: karánsebesi Pejka János) and the granddaughter of Petru Peica of Caransebeș (Hungarian: karánsebesi Pejka Péter) and his wife, Caterina Ostrovel (Hungarian: Osztrovy Katalin). The Ostrovels were a petty noble family from the County of Hunedoara (Latin: Comitatus Hunyadiensis, Hungarian: Hunyad vármegye), that has since died out.

The Peicas were in their own right a powerful family of the Banate of Lugoj and Caransebeș, securing important matrimonial alliances. Ana's first cousin, also named Ana, was married to Nicolae Gârleșteanu of Rudăria (Hungarian: rudariai Gerlistyei Miklós).

Her sister, Magdalena, was married to Ioan Fiat of Armeniș (Hungarian: eörményesi Fiáth János), whose descendants, the Barons Fiat of Armeniș (Hungarian: báró eörményesi Fiáth, German: Freiherr Fiath von Eörményes) would be granted the title of Austrian barons in 1858, and that of Hungarian barons in 1874.

Ana Vaida, the wife of Francisc Basarabă, stemmed from one of the most important families of the Banate of Lugoj and Caransebeș. She was likely the daughter of Bonaventura Vaida of Caransebeș and his wife, Elisabeta Gârleșteanu of Rudăria (Hungarian: rudariai Gerlistyei Erzsébet). The Vaidas were related to other important families from the region, such as the aforementioned Gârleșteanu of Rudăria, Fiat of Armeniș, or Jojică (Hungarian: Jósika), who would later be granted the title of Transylvanian barons in 1698, as Barons Iojică of Brănișca (Hungarian: báró branyicskai Jósika).

Through the Vaidas and the Peicas, the Basarabs were also related to other, less important, noble families from Banat and Transylvania, mostly of Romanian extraction, such as Csérényi of Blajfalăul de Jos (Hungarian: alsóbalásfalvi Csérényi), Kornis of Totvărădia (Hungarian: tótváradjai Kornis), Lățug of Delinești (Hungarian: delényesi Laczok), Marin of Caransebeș (Hungarian: karánsebesi Marin), Măcicaș of Tincova (Hungarian: tinkovai Macskássy), Országh, or Pobora of Zăvoi (Hungarian: závolyi Pobora).

== Members ==
- Ștefan/Sebastian Basarabă (m. 1544) was a nobleman from Caransebeș, in the Severin County
- Ioan Basarabă of Caransebeș (b. before 1554 - d. 1596/1597) was Ispán of Severin (1577) and Castellan of Caransebeș; he was married first to an unknown woman, and then to Ana Peica of Caransebeș (b. 1559 - d. after 1599)
- Francisc Basarabă of Caransebeș (b. before 1576 - d. 1592/1598) was Viceban of Lugoj and Caransebeș (1583), Ispán of Severin (1576-1598), and Castellan of Caransebeș; he was married to Ana Vaida of Caransebeș (b. before 1588 - d. after 1607)
- Mihail Basarabă (m. 1649) was a nobleman from Lugoj, in the Severin County
- Martin Basarabă (m. 1695–1698) was a nobleman from Lugoj, in the Severin County
- Ioan Basarabă (m. 1795) was a soldier from Mehadica, in the Banat Military Frontier
