= Basarab (disambiguation) =

Basarab or Bassarab can refer to:

- The House of Basarab
- Basarab railway station, in Bucharest, Romania
- Basarab metro station, in Bucharest, Romania
- Basarab Nicolescu
- Basarab Panduru
- Alexandru Bassarab
- Maria Basarab
- Olha Basarab
- Basarab I of Wallachia

== See also ==
- Basarabă of Caransebeș family
- Bessarabia
- Bessarab
