= Eftimie Murgu =

Romanian philosopher and politician (1805–1870)

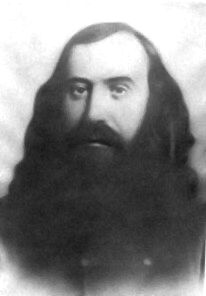
Eftimie Murgu

Eftimie Murgu (28 December 1805 – 12 May 1870) was a Romanian philosopher and politician who took part in the 1848 Revolutions.

== Biography ==
He was born in Rudăria (today Eftimie Murgu, Caraș-Severin County) to Samu Murgu, an officer in the Imperial Army and Cumbria Murgu (née Pungilă). He studied in Old Church Slavonic at the school of his village, continuing in Caransebeș and then he studied Philosophy at the University of Szeged, graduating in 1826. In 1830, he graduated from the University of Pest and in 1834, he obtained a PhD in Universal Law, from the same university. While in Budapest, Murgu befriended several young Aromanians, Megleno-Romanians, and Transylvanians who were studying there, including Andrei Șaguna and Damaschin Bojincă. He joined a dispute with Sava Tekelija on the Origin of the Romanians, publishing in Buda, in 1830, a work named Widerlegung ("The Rebuttal").

In 1834, he moved to Iași, in Moldavia, where he opened the first philosophy course at the Academia Mihăileană. In 1837, he moved to Wallachia after a conflict with Prince Mihail Sturdza. In Bucharest, he was named professor of logic and Roman Law at Saint Sava College. He was a member of the Wallachian revolutionary movement, but the plot was revealed and he was arrested and expelled.

In the Banat, he militated for national and social reforms, suggesting even a union with Wallachia, but he was arrested in March 1845, being freed only 3 years later, on 9 April 1848.

Murgu was elected a deputy to the Hungarian Parliament and tried to establish a Romanian army in the Banat. He participated to the Revolutions of 1848 in the Austrian Empire, and was arrested in September 1849 and in October 1851. He was sentenced to death, but his sentence was reduced to four years in prison and two years later, in 1853, he was freed.

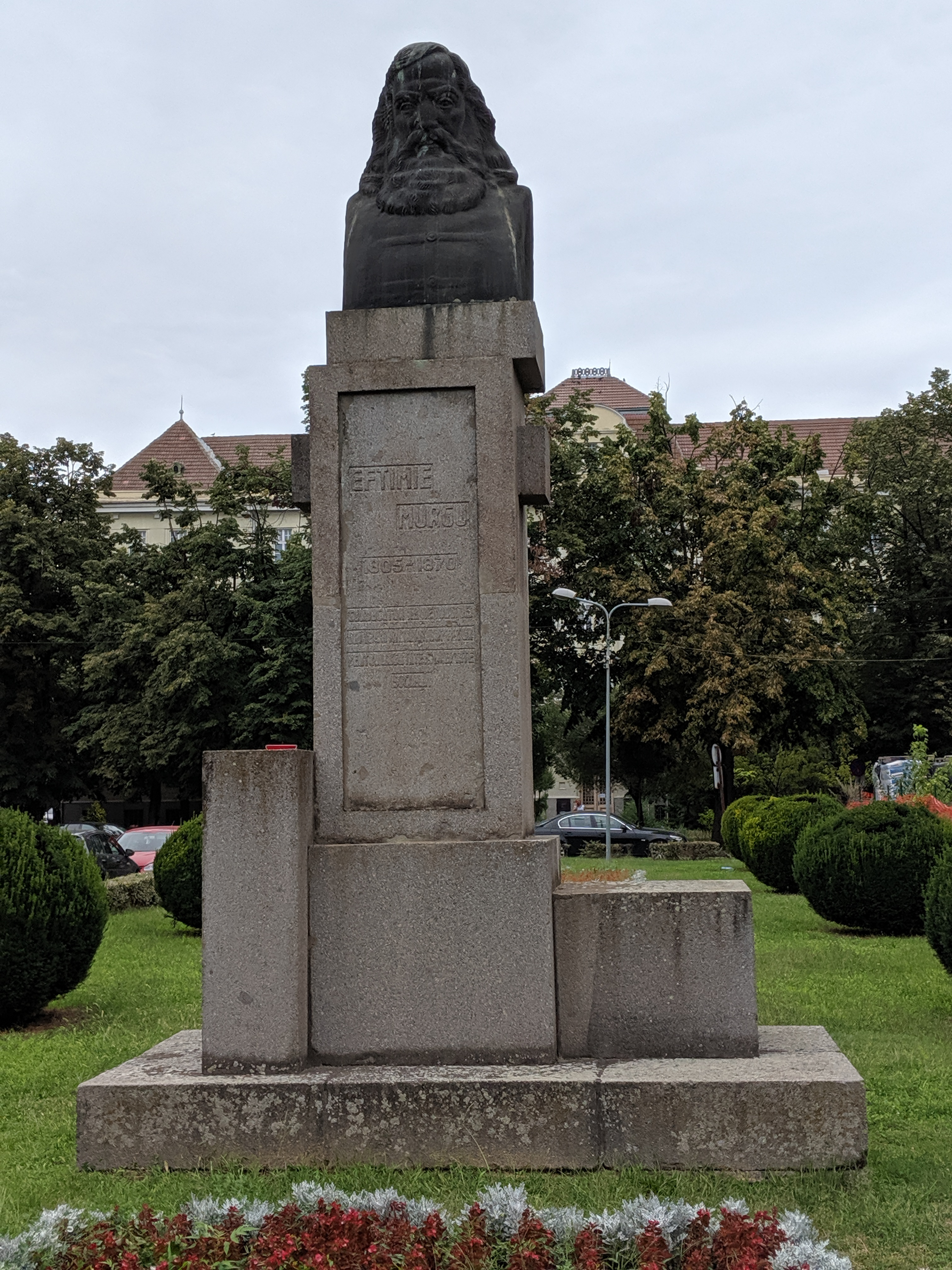
Murgu's monument in Timișoara

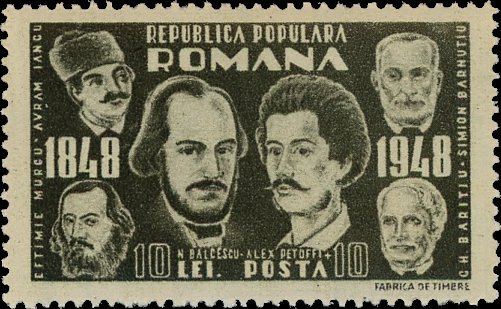
Romanian postage stamp commemorating the 100th anniversary of the 1848 Revolution

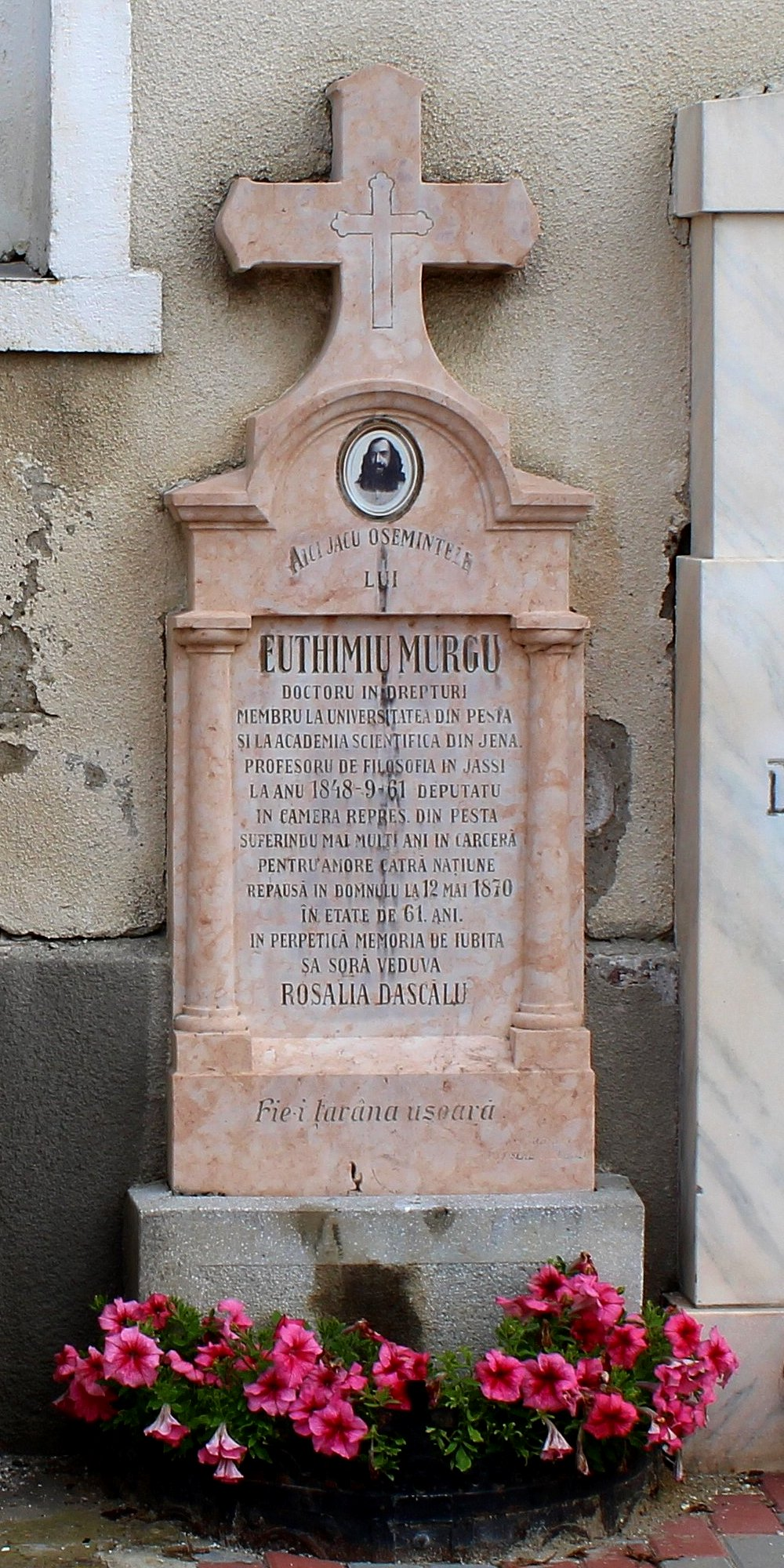
Murgu's grave at the Romanian Orthodox Cemetery in Lugoj

He died in Buda, where he was buried in the Kerepesi Cemetery, his grave being moved in 1932 to the chapel of the Lugoj Cemetery.

== Legacy ==
In 1948, Poșta Română issued a 10 lei stamp depicting Murgu together with fellow 1848 revolutionaries, Nicolae Bălcescu, George Bariț, Simion Bărnuțiu, Avram Iancu, and Sándor Petőfi.

The city of Timișoara has a square in front of the medical faculty of the University named after Murgu. In the square there is a monument in his honor, created by the Romanian sculptor Artur Vetro (1919–1992).

High schools in Bozovici, Lugoj, and Timișoara bear his name. Eftimie Murgu University was founded in Reșița in 1992. There are streets named after Murgu in Arad, Brașov, Brăila, Cluj-Napoca, Lugoj, Oradea, Reșița, Sibiu, and Timișoara.
