= LRCS =

LRCS may refer to:

- The ICAO code for Caransebeș Airport
- League of Red Cross Societies
- Licentiate of the Royal College of Surgeons
