= Constantin Diaconovici Loga National College =

Constantin Diaconovici Loga National College may refer to one of two educational institutions in Romania:

- Constantin Diaconovici Loga National College (Caransebeș)
- Constantin Diaconovici Loga National College (Timișoara)
