= Damian Isac =

Romanian professional footballer

Personal information
- Full name: Damian Daniel Isac
- Date of birth: 31 January 2001 (age 25)
- Place of birth: Caransebeș, Romania
- Height: 1.78 m (5 ft 10 in)
- Position: Midfielder

Youth career
- –2016: CSȘ Caransebeș
- 2016–2018: UTA Arad

Senior career*
Years	Team	Apps	(Gls)
2018–2023	UTA Arad	74	(0)
2023–2025	CSM Reșița	18	(1)
2026	Politehnica Timișoara	1	(0)

International career
2019	Romania U19	3	(0)
2021–2022	Romania U21	3	(0)
- * Club domestic league appearances and goals as of 28 March 2026

Damian Daniel Isac (born 31 January 2001) is a Romanian professional footballer who plays as a midfielder.

== Honours ==
UTA Arad

- Liga II: 2019–20

ASU Politehnica Timișoara

- Liga III: 2025–26
