= Rudăria coal mine =

Coal mine in Romania

Rudăria Coal mine
- Location: Eftimie Murgu, Caraș-Severin County, Romania
- Products: Coal
- Company: National Hard Coal Company

Rudăria Coal Mine is an underground mining exploitation, one of the largest in Romania located in Eftimie Murgu in the south-western part of the country in Caraș-Severin County. The legal entity managing the Rudăria mine is the National Hard Coal Company which was set up in 1998. The mine has reserves of 80 million tonnes of coal.

== See also ==
- Jiu Valley
- League of Miners Unions of the Jiu Valley
