= Strategy XXI Centre for Global Studies =

Ukrainian think tank

The Centre for Global Studies "Strategy XXI"
- Founded: March 2009
- Type: Public policy think tank
- Purpose: Research of global and national issues of energy sector developments, energy policies and international energy security, development of energy relations with countries from the Black Sea, Caspian, Baltic Sea regions, Central Asia and the EU
- Location: Kyiv, Ukraine
- Method: Analysis, recommendations and prognoses, assistance to studies
- Key people: Mykhailo Gonchar
- Website: http://geostrategy.org.ua/en/

The Centre for Global Studies "Strategy XXI" (Ukrainian: Центр глобалістики «Стратегія ХХІ») is a non-governmental, non-profit civil society organisation, which consolidates on a voluntary basis citizen to satisfy and protect their joint research, social and economic interests.

== Mission ==
The Centre Strategy XXI is engaged into research of global and national issues of energy sector developments, energy policies and international energy security, development of energy relations with countries from the Black Sea, Caspian, Baltic Sea regions, Central Asia and the European Union; development of scientific, analytical materials and guidelines for public authorities, NGOs and other interested institutions on energy policy and international security, the role and potential of Ukraine as a transit country, Ukraine's relations with the countries of these regions, international organizations and countries, showing interest in joint ventures with Ukraine at energy, communications and strategic energy resources mining projects; independent expertise on energy extraction, communication and transportation, mining and other energy related projects; information, technical and financial support to professionals and researchers, working in the area that corresponds to the subject of activities of the Centre Strategy XXI.

More recently the Centre Strategy XXI has specialised in energy efficiency and saving issues, promotion of sustainable energy sector development, and advocacy for improving national energy policies according to EU energy acquires. The Centre Strategy XXI is a member of the Multi-Stakeholder Group of Interested Parties on implementation of the Extractive Industries Transparency Initiative in Ukraine as well as the Revenue Watch Institute's network on transparency of energy markets in the Eurasian region.

The Centre Strategy XXI has contributed to the development of the most recent Energy strategy of Ukraine until 2035, draft laws on gas, electricity markets, national energy regulator, principles of transparent gas market functioning. Since 2016, the Centre Strategy XXI implements a joint project on sharing experience of the Visegrád Group countries with Ukraine in energy efficiency. In past two years, several policy reports and numerous articles were published on energy related topics, such as conventional and green energy governance, energy security, energy efficiency, energy strategy, diversification and security.

== See also ==
- Black Sea Security
