= Traian Doda National College =

Coordinates: 45.4109°N 22.2164°E

Traian Doda National College Romanian: Colegiul Național Traian Doda
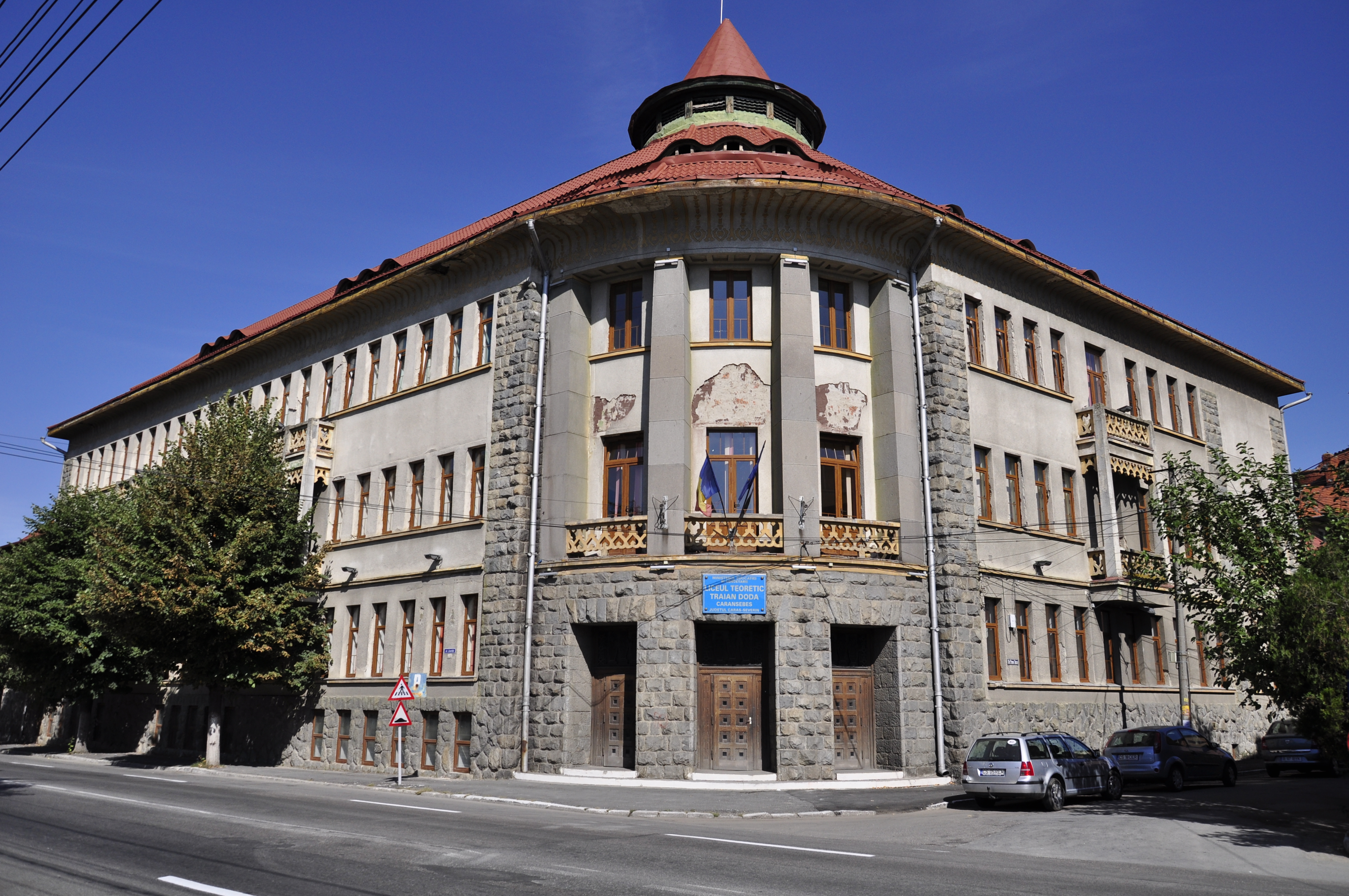

Information
- Established: October 4, 1914; 110 years ago
- Website: cntd.ro

Traian Doda National College (Romanian: Colegiul Național Traian Doda) is a high school located at 3 Efrem Zăcan Street, Caransebeș, Romania.

Between 1876 and 1880, the Romanian community of Caransebeș, then part of Austria-Hungary, began to organize with a view toward establishing a Romanian-language high school. General Traian Doda was placed in charge of the planning committee. It was not until 1913 that work on a building started. This was completed the following year, with courses starting on October 4, 1914, some two months into World War I. The official inauguration took place in 1918, when a statue dedicated to the fatherland was unveiled. In 1919, following the union of Transylvania with Romania, the school was named after Doda. A dormitory was begun in 1934; today, the building houses the primary and middle schools.

In 1948, after the onset of the communist regime, the Doda name was dropped and girls were admitted. In 1978, it became known as the Mathematics and Physics High School. The name of Doda was restored in 1990, after the Romanian Revolution, and his statue was unveiled in 1995. Repairs took place in 2006–2011, while the facade and gymnasium were redone in 2014. During that centennial year, the high school was declared a national college.

The school building is listed as a historic monument by Romania's Ministry of Culture and Religious Affairs, as is the fatherland sculpture.
