= Rudăria-Bănia mine =

Iron mine in Romania

- Location: Eftimie Murgu, Bănia, Caraș-Severin County, Romania
- Products: Iron ore
- Production: 500,000 tonnes of iron ore

The Rudăria-Bănia mine is a large open pit mine in the south-western Romania in Caraș-Severin County. Rudăria-Bănia represents one of the largest iron ore reserves in Romania having estimated reserves of 70 million tonnes of ore grading 45% iron metal and 20% manganese metal. The mine has the capability to produce around 500,000 tonnes of iron ore/year.
