= Volodymyr Dudka =

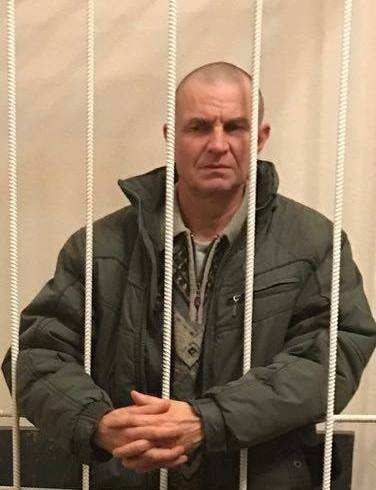
Volodymyr Dudka, political prisoner of the Kremlin

Volodymyr Dudka (Ukrainian: Володимир Дудка, Russian: Владимир Дудка, born September 30, 1964 (age 61), Sumy, Ukraine) is a political prisoner of the Kremlin. One of the accused in the case of the so-called 'Crimean terrorists' (group of 'Sevastopol saboteurs'). Detained by the FSB on November 9, 2016. Sentenced to 14 years in prison. Reserve captain 2nd rank of the Ukrainian Navy, former Commander of the Simferopol control ship (1997–2001). Served at the Ministry of Emergency Situations in Crimea before the arrest.

== Career ==
Born September 30, 1964, in Sumy. He studied at Sumy school No. 8 (now it is Alexander High School). Graduated in 1982. After school he worked at Frunze Sumy Research and Manufacturing Association. Since 1982 he served in the Soviet Armed Forces. After graduation from the 41st Naval School (Mykolaiv), conscript service passed in communication units of the Baltic Fleet. In 1983 he enrolled, and in 1988 graduated from the Faculty of Signals intelligence of the Kaliningrad Higher Naval School. After Officer Candidates School he served in the 112th Brigade of reconnaissance ships of the Black Sea Fleet (the village of Mirniy on Donuzlav Bay in Crimea) at the Odograph and Ocean Vishnya-class intelligence ships. He has repeatedly participated in the intelligence services of reconnaissance ships in the Mediterranean and the Atlantic. Since 1996, served in the Ukrainian Navy. From 1997 to 2001, served as Commander of the Simferopol control ship of the Ukrainian Navy. Participated in the Sea Breeze-96, Sea Breeze-97 exercises. Received the President of Ukraine Leonid Kuchma on the board of the ship. After 2001 he served in posts of the operational shift of the Command post of the Naval Headquarters of Ukraine. After retiring in 2009, until 2011, he worked at the Sevastopol City State Administration, then as a security engineer in a mobile detachment of the Ministry of Emergencies, which carried out demining of the Inkerman Storms and battle sites of World War II in the Mekenzie Mountains. After occupation Crimea by Russia, remained in Sevastopol, worked in a civilian position in the Ministry of Emergency Situations of the Russian Federation.

== Detention and prosecution ==
Detained by the Federal Security Service of Russia on November 9, 2016, in Sevastopol, on his way to the hospital, where he went with the exacerbation of gastric ulcer. For several days, Volodymyr Dudka's whereabouts were unknown. On November 10, the FSB stated that he was allegedly a member of the "sabotage-terrorist group of the Chief Directorate of Intelligence of the Ministry of Defence of Ukraine". He was charged with planning sabotage actions at military infrastructure and support facilities in Sevastopol. The independent lawyer was only able to reach Dudka on November 14, 2016. Volodymyr managed to inform him that he was innocent of anything, and his testimony was received from him under pressure and threats against his relatives. Later, during the trial, Dudka and Oleksiy Bessarabov, who is another participant of the 'saboteurs case', repeatedly stated that in the first days after their detention, they were tortured, including electric shock. However, the Investigative Committee of Russia denied the initiation of the torture proceedings against prisoners.

The trial of Dudka and Bessarabov, who refused to plead guilty, lasted more than 2.5 years. After completion of the first trial, the occupying Sevastopol city court was unable to reach a verdict and on April 6, 2018, returned to the prosecutor's office a 'sabotage case' to remedy the shortcomings. On August 2, 2018, a reconsideration trial of the merits of the case began in the Sevastopol City Court. On April 4, 2019, the Sevastopol City Court sentenced Volodymyr Dudka under the articles of Part 1 of Art. 30, item A of Part 2 of Art. 281 (“Preparation for diversion as part of an organized group”) Part 3, Article 222.1 (Illegal acquisition, storage of explosives or devices by an organized group) of the Criminal Code of Russia to 14 years of imprisonment with serving in a penal colony and a fine of 350 000 rubles. The defendants' appeals against fraud and gross misconduct were dismissed by the Supreme Court of Russia.

In June 2018 the European Parliament adopted a resolution in which it demands Russian authorities to immediately and unconditionally release illegally detained Ukrainian citizens including Volodymyr Dudka.

== See also ==
- Roman Sushchenko
