= Black Sea Security =

Ukrainian magazine, 2005–2014

- Editor: Mykhailo Gonchar (since 2017)
- Categories: International relations
- Frequency: Quarterly
- Publisher: Nomos Center (2005-2013), Strategy XXI Centre for Global Studies (since 2017)
- First issue: 8 February 2005 (re-registered 11 December 2017)
- Country: Ukraine
- Language: English, Ukrainian
- Website: geostrategy.org.ua/en/chornomorska-bezpeka
- ISSN: 2616-9274

Black Sea Security (Ukrainian: Чорноморська безпека) was a Ukrainian magazine covering security problems in the Black Sea and Caspian Region. It was published by the Nomos Center and was established on 8 February 2005. Articles were published in Ukrainian or Russian, sometimes in English with Russian translation. All articles included short summaries in English. The magazine ceased publication in 2014 when Nomos Center was closed following the annexation of Crimea by Russia. Oleksiy Bessarabov, the deputy chief editor of the magazine, was detained in 2014.

== See also ==
- Strategy XXI Centre for Global Studies
- Nomos Center
