= Wilhelm Klein =

Hungarian-Austrian archeologist (1850–1924)

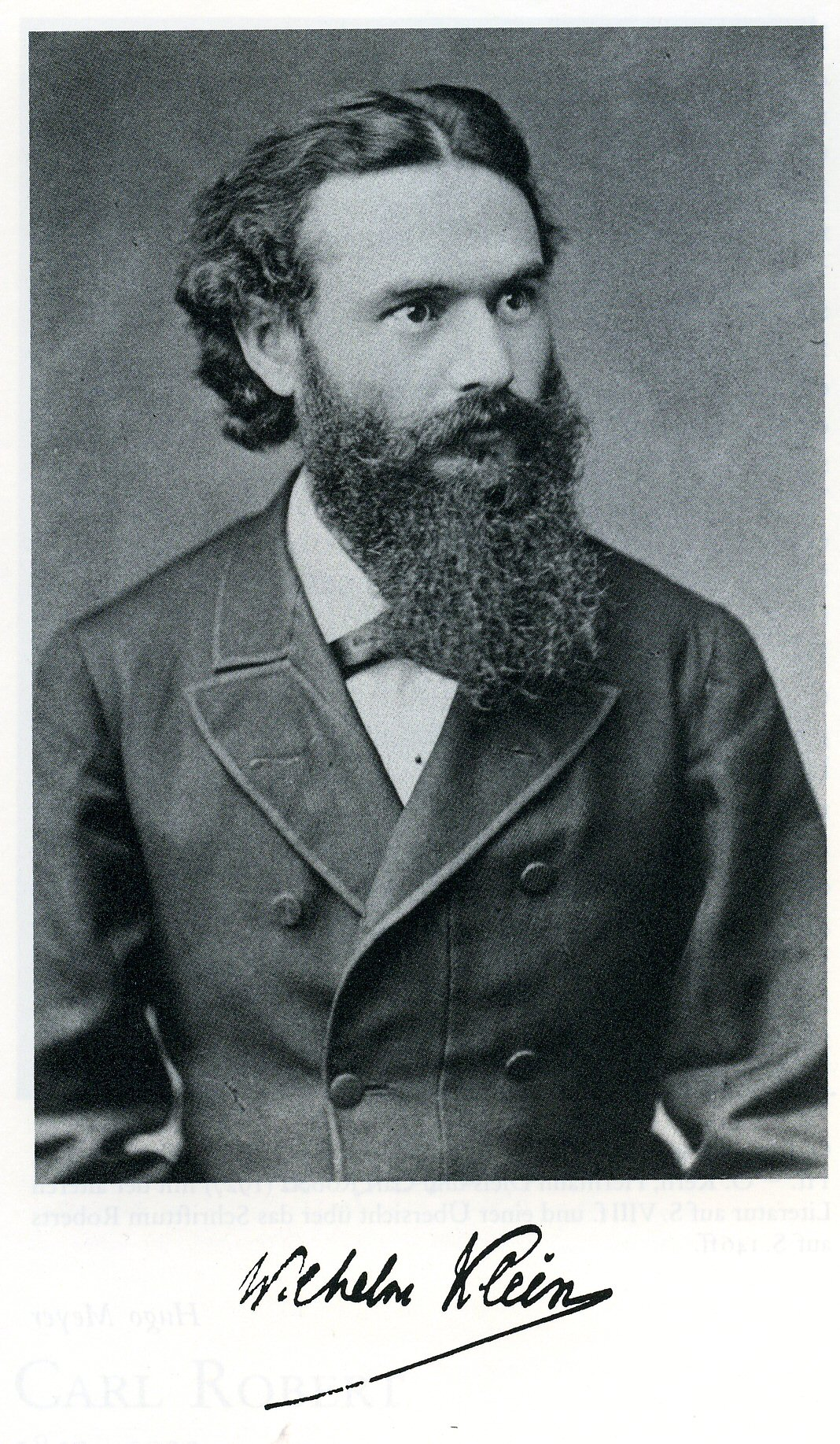
Wilhelm Klein (1850–1924)

Wilhelm Klein (28 November 1850 in Karansebesch, Austrian Empire – 2 February 1924 in Hejnice, Czechoslovakia) was a Hungarian-Austrian archeologist.

He was born in Karansebesch, Szörény County, Principality of Transylvania (1711–1867), Austrian Empire (today Caransebeș, Caraș-Severin County, Romania)

He first studied Jewish theology and then philosophy at Vienna and Prague. The Austrian government subsequently sent him to Italy and Greece, where he engaged in archeological investigations, studying especially antique pottery. Klein was a professor of archeology at the German University of Prague, and a member of the Gesellschaft zur Förderung Deutscher Wissenschaft, Kunst, und Literatur in Böhmen, as well as of the German Archeological Institute.

He has published: "Euphronius" (1886); "Die Griechischen Vasen, mit Meisterinschriften" (2d edition, Vienna, 1887); and "Praxiteles" (1897).
