= Oleksiy Bessarabov =

Ukrainian journalist (born 1976)

Bessarabov Oleksiy Evgenovich
- Born: December 5, 1976 (age 49); Kresttsy, Novgorod Oblast, Soviet Union
- Education: Nakhimov Naval Academy (Sevastopol); Taras Shevchenko National University of Kyiv
- Occupation: journalist
- Years active: 2006–2013
- Children: 1

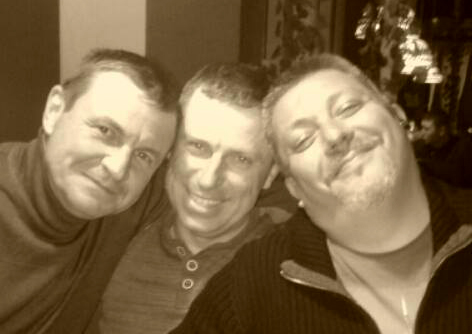
The "Crimean terrorists": Vladimar Dudka, Oleksiy Bessarabov, and Dmitry Shtyblykov. (12 May, 2013)

Oleksiy Bessarabov (Ukrainian: Олексій Бессарабов, Russian: Алексей Бессарабов, born December 5, 1976) is a Ukrainian journalist, Political prisoner in Russia, one of the accused in the case of the so-called 'Crimean terrorists' (group of 'Sevastopol saboteurs'). He was detained by the FSB on November 9, 2016, and was sentenced to 14 years in prison.

== Career ==
Born December 5, 1976, in Kresttsy village, Novgorod Oblast (now in Russia). Together with his parents in 1977 he moved to Sevastopol. He studied at Sevastopol Secondary School No. 23, and since 1993 at School No. 34, which he graduated with honors in 1994. Since 1994 he was a cadet at the Nakhimov Naval Academy (Sevastopol). He studied gun-missile integrated weapon systems of surface vessels, was awarded the Certificate of Honor of the Presidium of the Verkhovna Rada of the Autonomous Republic of Crimea for excellent training results, high military discipline and conscientious performance of duty. He graduated with honors in 1999. From 1999 to 2005, he served as an officer in the Ukrainian Navy. He retired from military service for health reasons on August 29, 2005. Has a rank of captain lieutenant.

After returning to civilian life, from 2006 to 2009 he received his second higher education at the Kyiv Taras Shevchenko National University in journalism. He worked as a correspondent at the Glavred news agency. Nicknamed Oleksii Streletsky, he is published in the magazines Shipping, Black Sea Security, Dzerkalo Tyzhnia and others. Since 2009 Bessarabov was Deputy Editor-in-Chief of the Black Sea Security magazine, expert of the Center for Assistance to the Study of Geopolitical Issues and Euro-Atlantic Cooperation of the Black Sea Region NOMOS. He has been publishing in the media, in particular, writing about the problems of the Black Sea Fleet based in Sevastopol.

== Prosecution ==
Detained by the Federal Security Service of Russia on November 9, 2016, in Sevastopol. For several days, Oleksiy Bessarabov's whereabouts were unknown. On November 10, the FSB stated that he was allegedly a member of the "sabotage-terrorist group of the Chief Directorate of Intelligence of the Ministry of Defence of Ukraine". He was charged with planning sabotage actions at military infrastructure and support facilities in Sevastopol. The independent lawyer was only able to reach Bessarabov on November 14, 2016. Oleksiy managed to inform him that he was innocent of anything, and his testimony was received from him under pressure and threats against his relatives. Later, during the trial, Bessarabov and Volodymyr Dudka, who is another participant of the 'saboteurs case', repeatedly stated that in the first days after their detention, they were tortured, including electric shock. However, the Investigative Committee of Russia denied the initiation of the torture proceedings against prisoners.

The trial of Bessarabov and Dudka, who refused to plead guilty, lasted more than 2.5 years. After completion of the first trial, the occupying Sevastopol city court was unable to reach a verdict and on April 6, 2018, returned to the prosecutor's office a 'sabotage case' to remedy the shortcomings. On August 2, 2018, a reconsideration trial of the merits of the case began in the Sevastopol City Court. On April 4, 2019, the Sevastopol City Court sentenced Volodymyr Dudka under the articles of Part 1 of Art. 30, item A of Part 2 of Art. 281 ("Preparation for diversion as part of an organized group") Part 3, Article 222.1 (Illegal acquisition, storage of explosives or devices by an organized group) of the Criminal Code of Russia to 14 years of imprisonment with serving in a penal colony and a fine of 300 000 rubles. The defendants' appeals against fraud and gross misconduct were dismissed by the Supreme Court of Russia.

In June 2018 the European Parliament adopted a resolution in which it demands Russian authorities to immediately and unconditionally release illegally detained Ukrainian citizens including Oleksiy Bessarabov.

== Personal life ==
Married, has a son.
