= Constantin Diaconovici Loga National College (Caransebeș) =

High school in Caransebeș, Romania

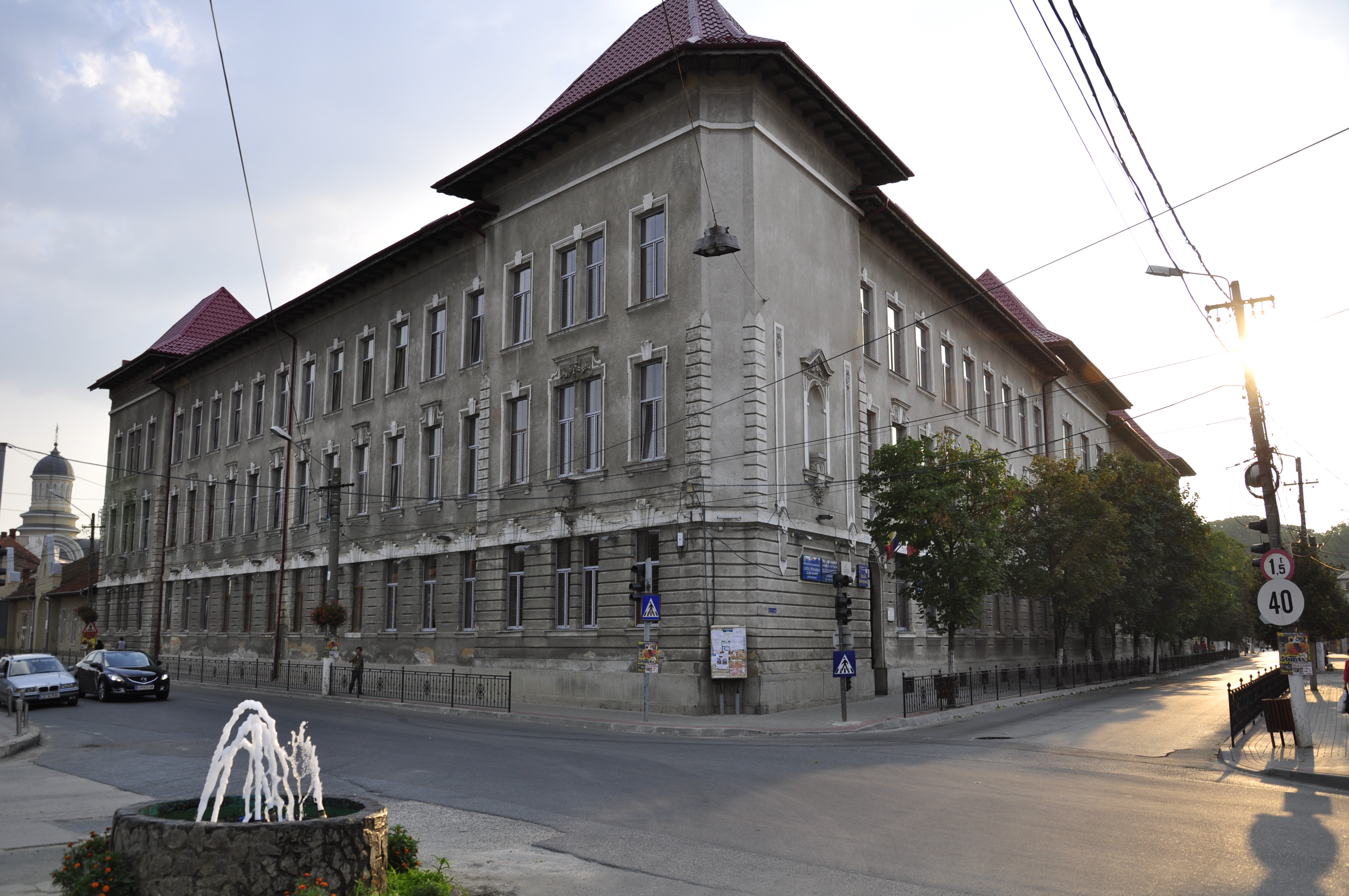
Constantin Diaconovici Loga National College

Constantin Diaconovici Loga National College (Romanian: Colegiul Național Constantin Diaconovici Loga) is a high school located at 16 C. D. Loga Street, Caransebeș, Romania.

The school traces its origins to 1582, when a document mentions a teacher training school in Caransebeș. In 1871, Ioan Popasu, the Romanian Orthodox Bishop of Caransebeș, named it the Diocesan Pedagogical Institute. Its program lasted three years, extended to four in 1895. Four lower grades were added in 1919, after the union of Transylvania with Romania. In 1948, the nascent communist regime eliminated the pedagogical focus, which was restored in 1969.

The school building, inaugurated in 1899, is listed as a historic monument by Romania's Ministry of Culture and Religious Affairs. The upper story, begun in 1924, was completed in 1956.
