= Irina Bessarabova =

Russian documentary director, screenwriter, actress, and poetess

Irina Yurievna Bessarabova (February 12, 1961– September 15, 2018; Russian: Ирина Юрьевна Бессарабова) was a Russian film director (mostly documentary), screenwriter, actress, and poetess.

Bessarabova was born in Saratov. She graduated from VGIK in 1983. After that she worked with various film studios

== Filmography ==
She directed and wrote screenplays for over 30 films.

- «Петр Столыпин»
- «Спасительный храм. Голоса художников»
- "Алые паруса Василия Ланового" (2008),
  A documentary about Vasily Lanovoy
- Преображение (Взгляните на лицо) (2002)
- Григорий Коган. Транскрипция (2004)
- Маленькая дверь консерватории (2005)
- "Свобода по-русски" [Freedom in a Russian Way] (2006 ten-series documentary), co-director
  A documentary about the history of parliamentarism in Russia
- Другая улыбка (2011), directing, screenplay
- "Мое сердце не стало грубее" (1990),
- "Куда идет гигант?" [Where Does the Giant Go?] (1987),
- "Пол-листа бумаги" [Half-Sheet of Paper] (1994, feature film) screenplay, director
  About the history of Soviet emigration and Russian life under totalitarianism
- TV crime series "Слепой", actress
- 2008 - Odd-winged Angel (Нечетнокрылый ангел) [documentary, 52 mn]
- «Под говор пьяных мужичков» (2010)
  A documentary featuring Russian actor and filmmaker Andrei Smirnov
  Special jury prize at the Saratov Pains film festival; special prize at the Tarkovsky Mirror Film Festival

== Poetry ==
- "Первый живописный слой",
- "Неузнанная жизнь",
