= Caransebeș Airport =

Banat Airport Caransebeș Aeroportul Banat Caransebeș
- IATA: CSB; ICAO: LRCS

Summary
- Airport type: Private
- Location: Caransebeș, Caraș-Severin County, Romania
- Built: 1969
- Elevation AMSL: 864 ft / 263 m
- Coordinates: 45°25′13″N 22°15′08″E
- Website: www.banatairport.com

Map
- Location within Romania

Runways
Direction	Length		Surface
Direction	m	ft	Surface
10/28	2,000	6,562	Concrete
- Source: Romanian AIP at EUROCONTROL

Banat Airport Caransebeș or Aeroportul Caransebeș (IATA: CSB, ICAO: LRCS) is located 1.8 km (1.1 mi) east northeast of Caransebeș in western Romania, in Caraș-Severin County.

== History ==
A former military base, this was the only commercial airport in Romania not located in the proximity of a large urban area. Currently there is no regular service to this airport. In 1994 TAROM suspended its direct flights from Aurel Vlaicu International Airport in Bucharest, and in 2002 the airport was bought by a private company. In 2019 the owner changed and in 2020 they opened for traffic. The airport management together with authorities are working to open the airport for international traffic.

== Facilities ==
There is a large capacity of parking for aircraft. The management estimate that approximately 45 Airbus A320s or 65 ATR 72s may be parked in the airport. The Banat Aviation Academy is located on the airport premises.

== See also ==
- Aviation in Romania
- Transport in Romania
