= Nomos Center =

Ukrainian non-governmental think tank

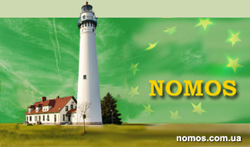
- Founded: November 2003 disestablished in April, 2014
- Dissolved: April 2014
- Type: Public policy think tank
- Purpose: geopolitical problems and euroatlantic cooperation of the Black sea region
- Location: Sevastopol, Ukraine
- Region served: Black Sea region
- Method: analysis, recommendations and prognoses, assistance to studies
- Key people: Sergiy Kulyk
- Website: nomos.com.ua/english version

Nomos Center (Ukrainian: Центр «Номос») or fully the Center for assistance to the geopolitical problems and euroatlantic cooperation of the Black sea region studies Nomos (Ukrainian: Центр сприяння вивченню геополітичних проблем і євроатлантичного співробітництва Чорноморського регіону «Номос») was a Ukrainian non-governmental public policy think tank.

== History ==
Nomos Center was established in November, 2003 as independent NGO, the goal of which is taking part and support programs and projects of political analysis and strategic researches in the field of general security, information spreading about the European and euroatlantic integration processes.

The project was planned as instrument of intellectual integration of Ukrainian and foreign elites, the field for the dialogue and discussion between the experts circles and politicians on the state and perspectives of the Black Sea, Caspian and Baltic regions.

It was closed in April 2014 after the occupation of Crimea by the Russian Federation.

== Statutory mission ==
The main aim of Nomos was the assistance to the geopolitical problems in the Black Sea region, analysis, recommendations and prognoses preparation in the sphere of home and foreign policy of Ukraine and international relations as a whole, information spreading about the European and euroatlantic integration processes.

== Methods ==
The Nomos Center worked on:

- independent strategic analysis and events evaluation, which concern all the main aspects of the national and international security;
- information on European and euroathlantic integration problems;
- promotion for GOs and NGOs, international institutions, political parties on organization and conduct international, educational and other programs;
- drawing up recommendations to remove existing and potential threats to national interests and priorities of Ukraine;
- international economic and political development experience summering, new approaches to innovational development in Ukraine, scientific public attraction to conduct researches on actual problems of geopolitics, voting technologies, and actual articles publication in native and foreign sources;
- taking part in social researches and public opinion-polls;
- taking part in the projects on civil control over the security sector of state.

Nomos Center published all-Ukrainian quarterly journal The Black Sea Security (Ukrainian: «Чорноморська безпека») in which informational and analytical articles, dedicated to various aspects of regional and international security were published.
