= Bessarab =

Bessarab or Besarab is a toponymic surname literally meaning "person from Bessarabia.

- Siarhei Besarab, Belarusian scientist and political activist
- Serhiy Bessarab
- Svetlana Bessarab

== See also ==
- Basarab (disambiguation)
