= Eftimie Murgu, Caraș-Severin =

Eftimie Murgu
- Commune
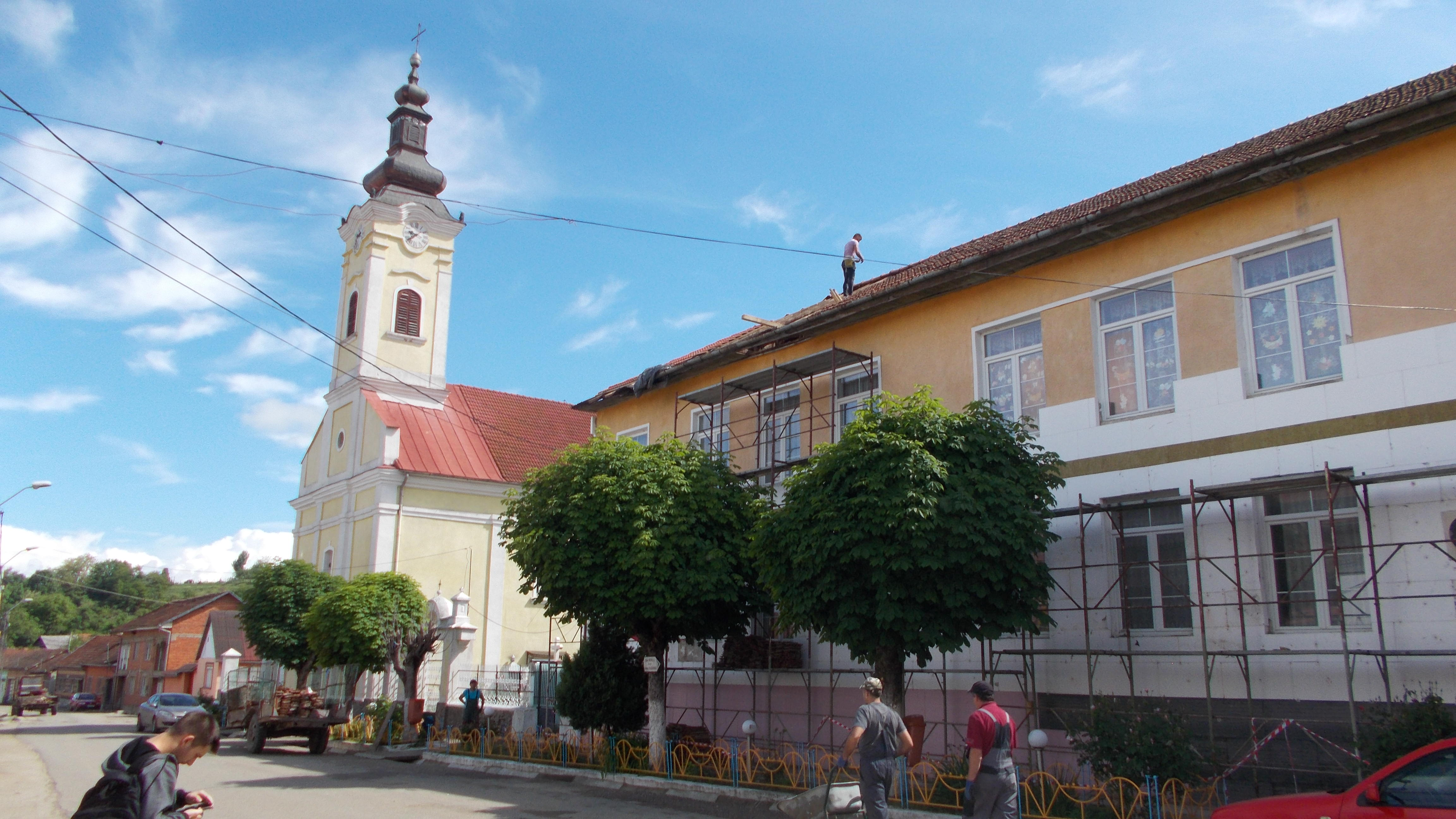

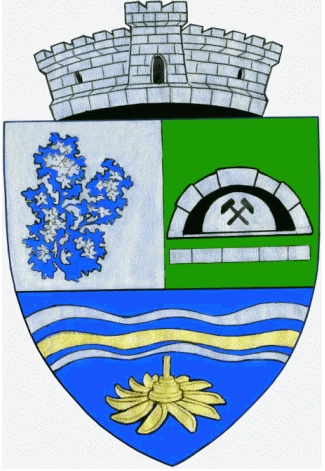
- Coat of arms

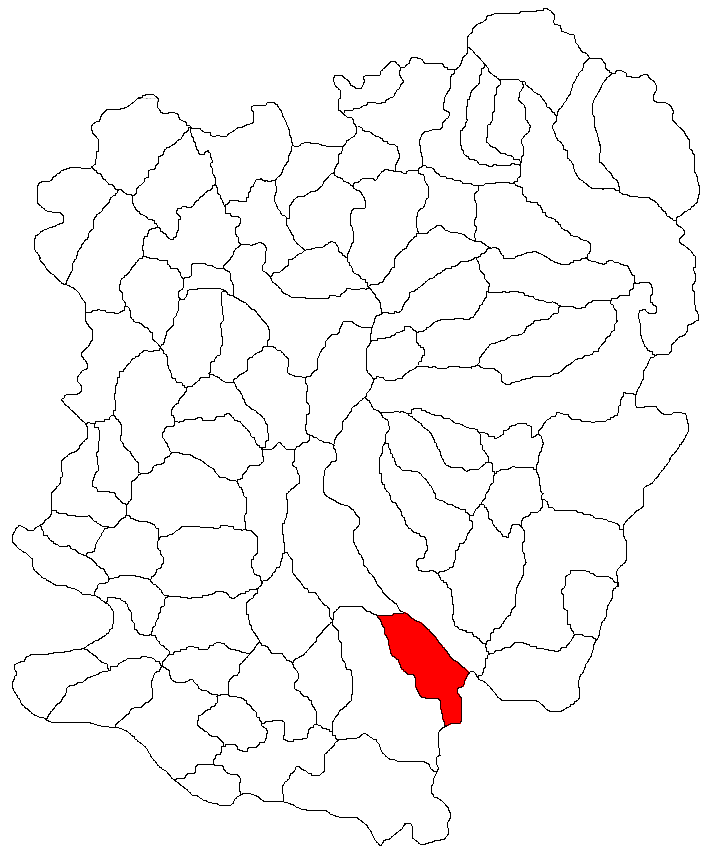
- Location in Caraș-Severin County

- Location in Romania
- Coordinates: 44°54′N 22°06′E
- Country: Romania
- County: Caraș-Severin

Government
  - Mayor (2020–2024): Mihai Otiman (PNL)
- Area: 99.02 km^{2} (38.23 sq mi)
- Elevation: 329 m (1,079 ft)
- Population (2021-12-01): 1,296
  - Density: 13.09/km^{2} (33.90/sq mi)
- Time zone: UTC+02:00 (EET)
  - Summer (DST): UTC+03:00 (EEST)
- Postal code: 327190
- Area code: +(40) 02 55
- Vehicle reg.: CS
- Website: www.primariaeftimiemurgu.ro

Eftimie Murgu (called Rudăria until 1970, when it was renamed after the revolutionary born there; Hungarian: Ógerlistye) is a commune in Caraș-Severin County, western Romania, with a population of 1,296 people as of 2021. It is composed of a single village, Eftimie Murgu.

The commune is named after Eftimie Murgu (1805–1870), a philosopher and member of the 1848 revolutionary movements in Wallachia and the Banat.

Historical population
| Year | Pop. | ±% |
|---|---|---|
| 1791 | 1,310 | — |
| 1802 | 1,431 | +9.2% |
| 1858 | 2,413 | +68.6% |
| 1879 | 2,772 | +14.9% |
| 1900 | 2,830 | +2.1% |
| 1910 | 2,709 | −4.3% |
| 1930 | 2,459 | −9.2% |
| 1948 | 2,378 | −3.3% |
| 1956 | 2,384 | +0.3% |
| 1970 | 2,254 | −5.5% |
| 1980 | 2,102 | −6.7% |
| 1990 | 1,844 | −12.3% |
| 2002 | 1,822 | −1.2% |
| 2011 | 1,628 | −10.6% |
| 2021 | 1,296 | −20.4% |
Source: Census data

At the 2011 census, the commune had 1,628 inhabitants, of which 96.87% were Romanians; 85.6% were Romanian Orthodox and 14.2% Baptist. At the 2021 census, Eftimie Murgu had a population of 1,296, of which 94.21% were Romanians.

The Rudăria-Bănia ore mine and the Rudăria coal mine are located on the territory of the commune.
