= Caransebeș =

- Municipality
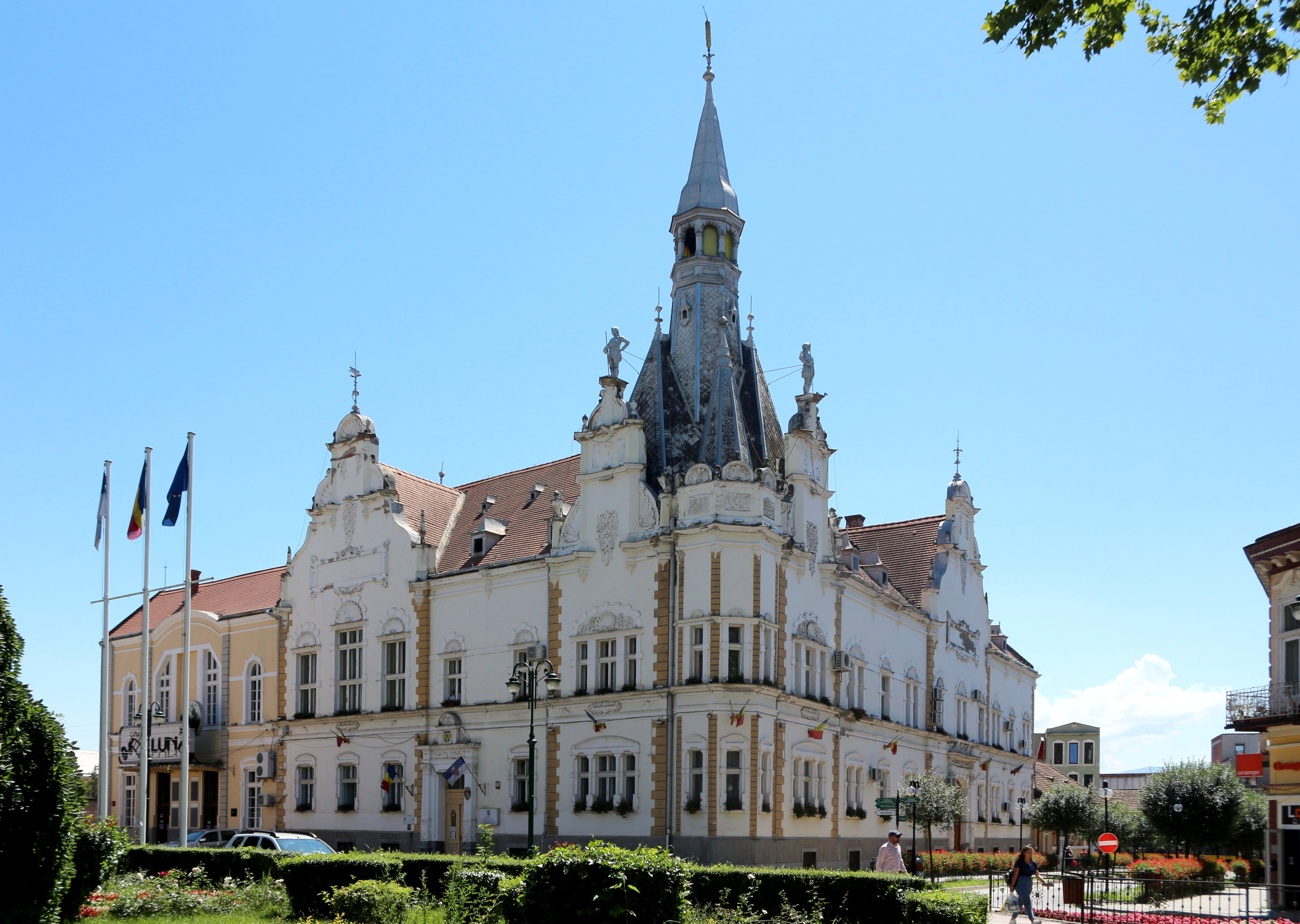
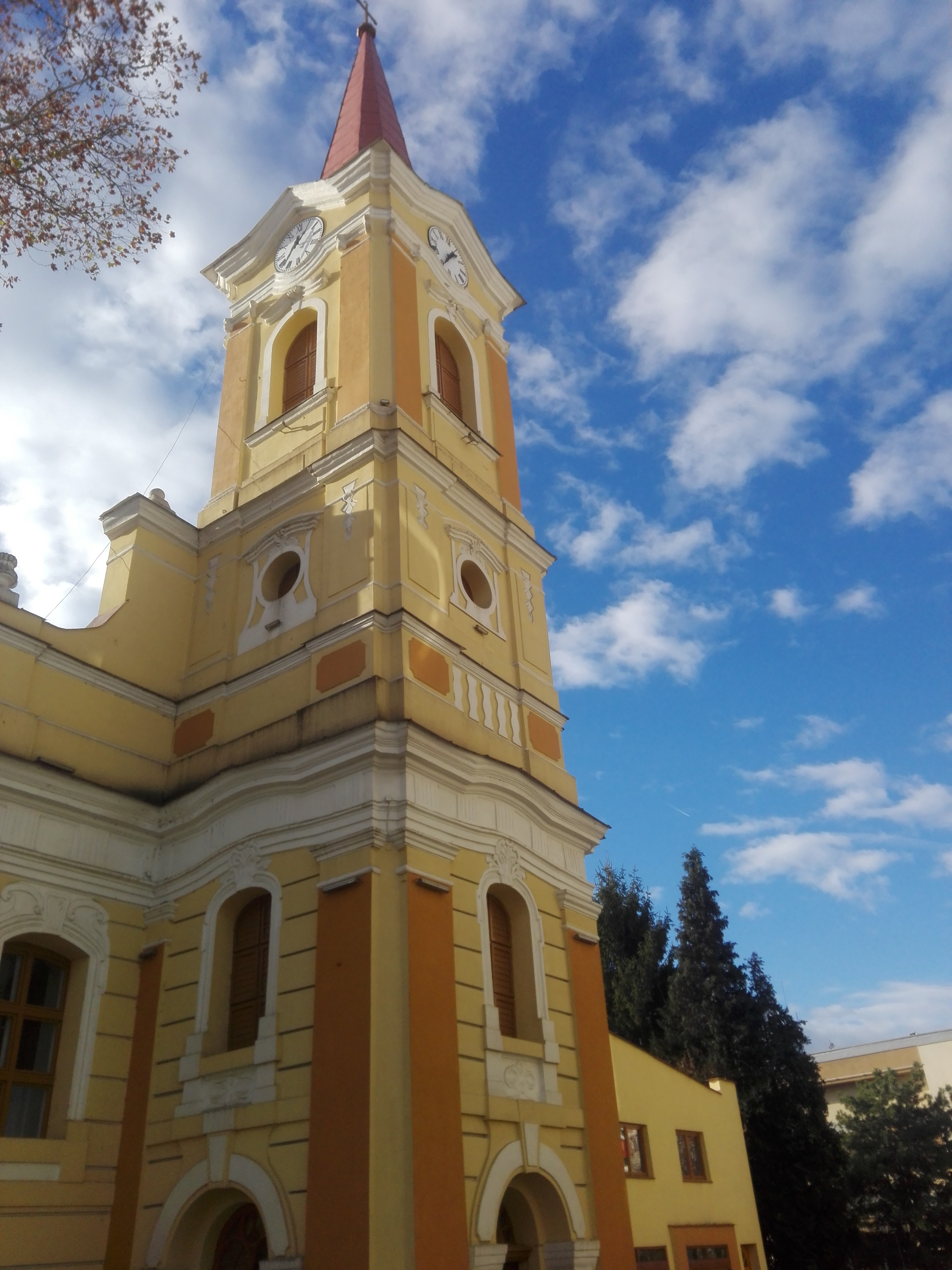
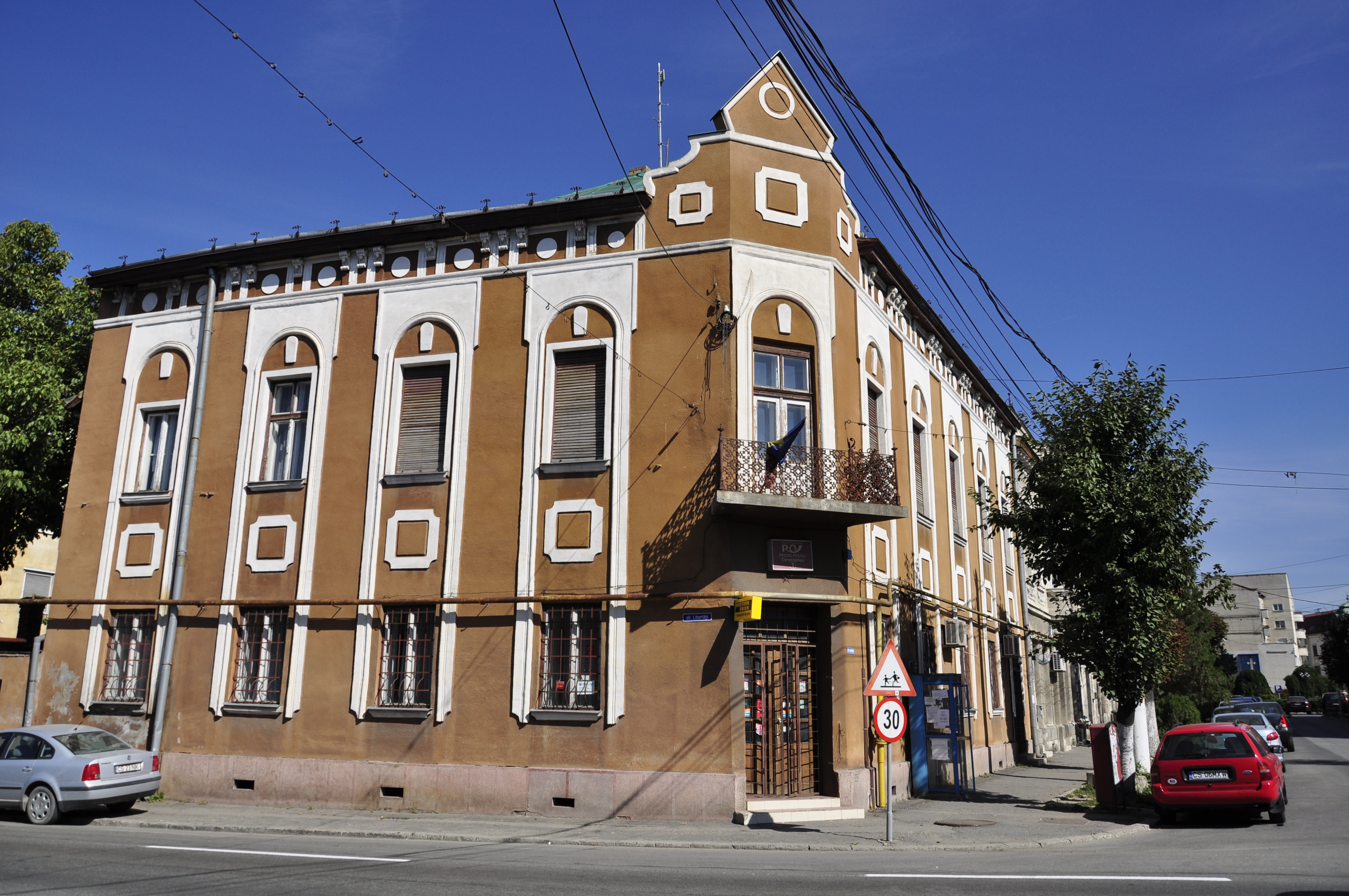
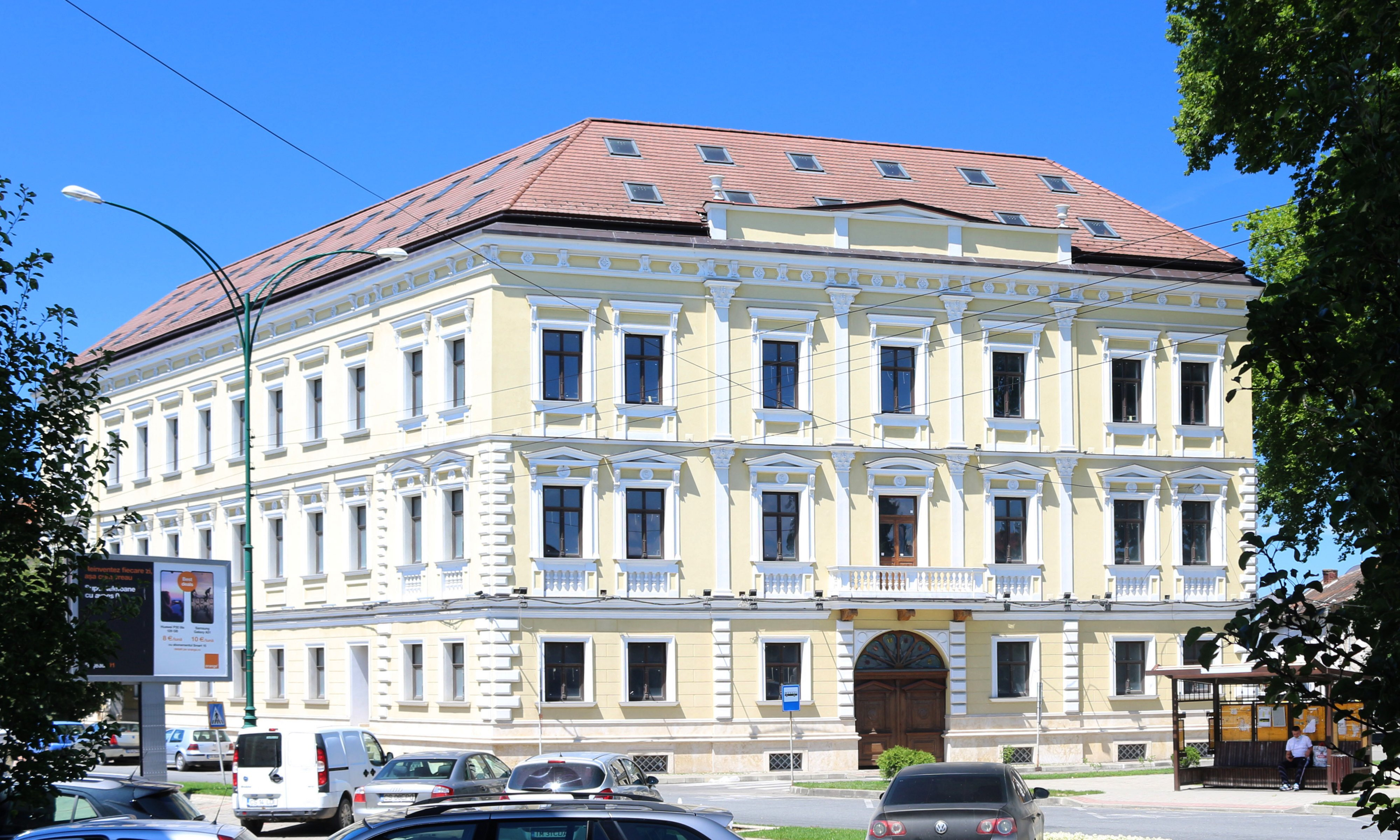
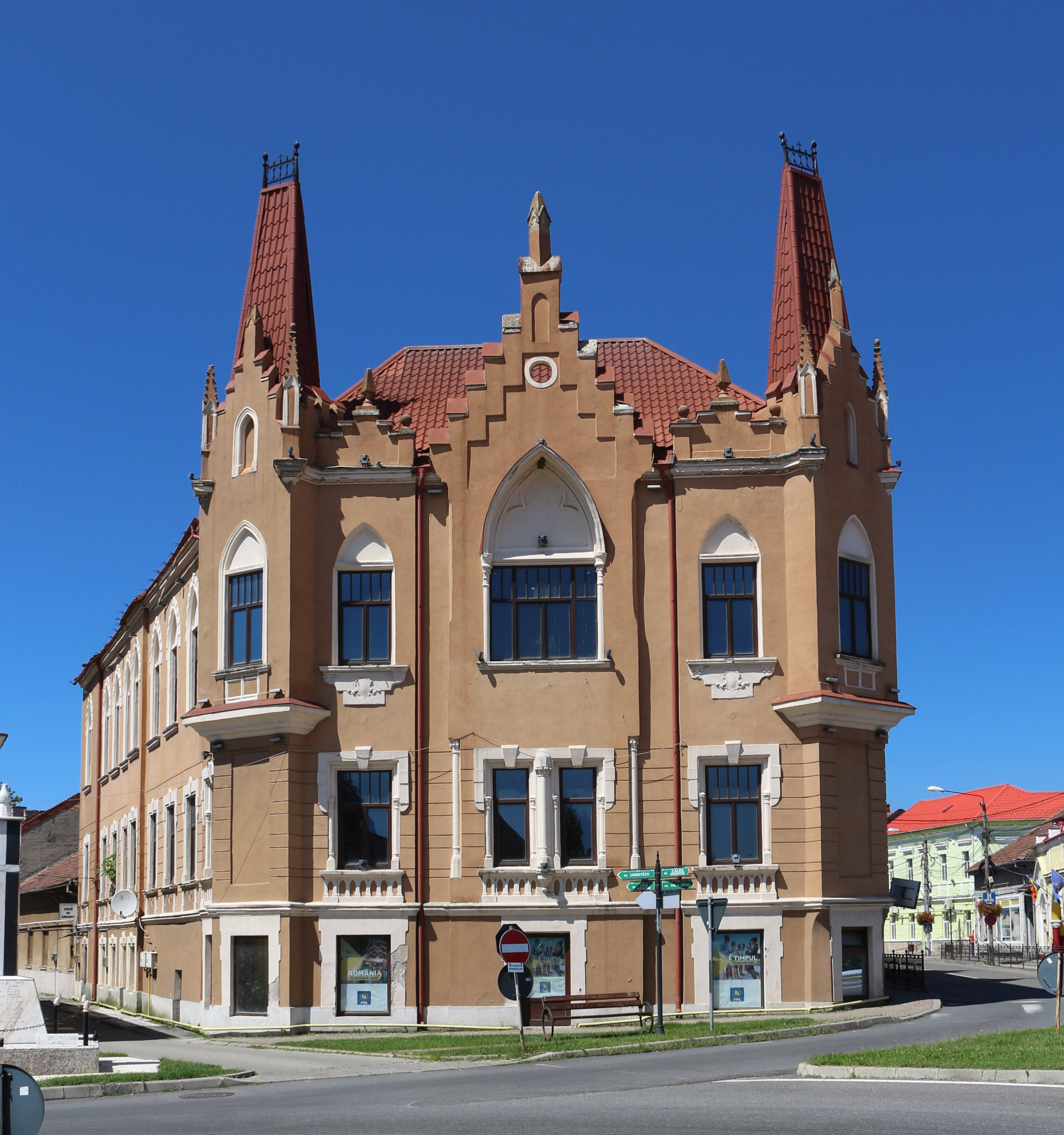
- Caransebeș City Hall Roman Catholic Church Caransebeș post office Officers’ pavillion House of savings

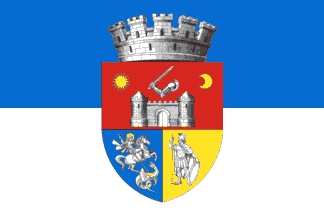
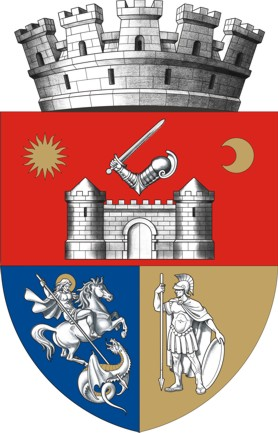
- Flag Coat of arms

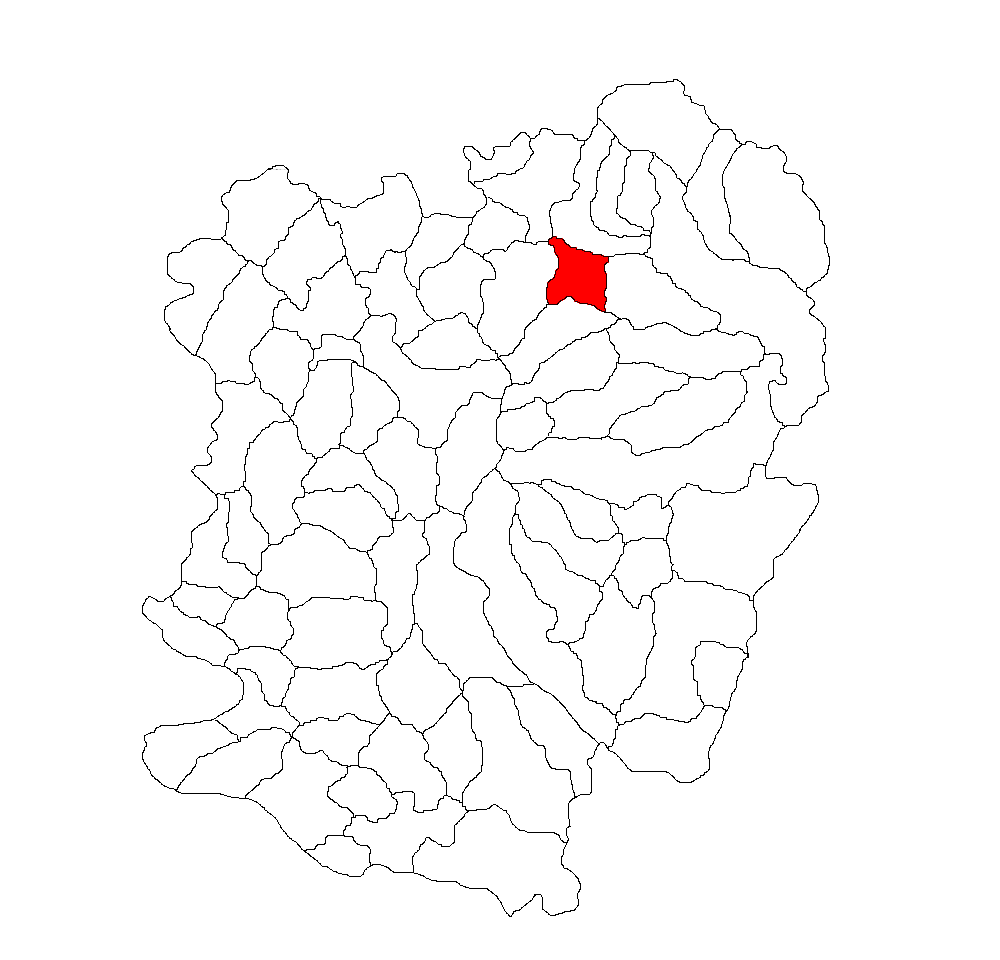
- Location in Caraș-Severin County

- Location in Romania
- Coordinates: 45°25′17″N 22°13′19″E
- Country: Romania
- County: Caraș-Severin

Government
  - Mayor (2024–2028): Felix Borcean (PSD)
- Area: 70.08 km^{2} (27.06 sq mi)
- Population (2021-12-01): 21,714
  - Density: 309.8/km^{2} (802.5/sq mi)
- Time zone: UTC+02:00 (EET)
  - Summer (DST): UTC+03:00 (EEST)
- Postal code: 325400
- Area code: (+40) 02 55
- Vehicle reg.: CS
- Website: www.primaria-caransebes.ro

Caransebeș (Romanian pronunciation: [karanˈsebeʃ]; German: Karansebesch, German pronunciation: [ˈkaːʁanzebɛʃ]; Hungarian: Karánsebes, Hungarian pronunciation: [ˈkɒraːnʃɛbɛʃ]) is a city in Caraș-Severin County, part of the Banat region in southwestern Romania. One village, Jupa (Hungarian: Zsuppa), is administered by the city.

The city is located at the confluence of the Timiș River with the Sebeș River, the latter flowing from the Țarcu Mountains. To the west, it is in direct contact with the Banat Hills. It is an important railroad node, being located approximately 40 km from the county seat, Reșița, 21 km from Oțelu Roșu, 70 km from Hațeg, and about 25 km from the Muntele Mic ski resort, in the Țarcu Mountains.

== Climate ==
Caransebeș has an oceanic climate (Cfb in the Köppen climate classification), with an average of 0–15 °C (32–59 °F), but summers can be warm, with an average of 20–24 °C (68–75 °F). Rainfall can be quite abundant throughout the year.

Climate data for Caransebeș (1991–2020, extremes since 1991)
Month	Jan	Feb	Mar	Apr	May	Jun	Jul	Aug	Sep	Oct	Nov	Dec	Year
Record high °C (°F)	20.7 (69.3)	21.9 (71.4)	27.2 (81.0)	31.3 (88.3)	32.8 (91.0)	37.3 (99.1)	40.3 (104.5)	39.4 (102.9)	38.6 (101.5)	32.1 (89.8)	26.4 (79.5)	19.1 (66.4)	40.3 (104.5)
Mean daily maximum °C (°F)	4.1 (39.4)	6.6 (43.9)	11.9 (53.4)	17.8 (64.0)	22.4 (72.3)	26.0 (78.8)	28.2 (82.8)	28.6 (83.5)	23.0 (73.4)	17.7 (63.9)	11.3 (52.3)	5.1 (41.2)	16.9 (62.4)
Daily mean °C (°F)	0.1 (32.2)	1.7 (35.1)	6.0 (42.8)	11.5 (52.7)	16.0 (60.8)	19.6 (67.3)	21.3 (70.3)	21.2 (70.2)	16.1 (61.0)	11.3 (52.3)	6.6 (43.9)	1.5 (34.7)	11.1 (52.0)
Mean daily minimum °C (°F)	−3.0 (26.6)	−1.7 (28.9)	1.6 (34.9)	6.3 (43.3)	10.3 (50.5)	13.5 (56.3)	14.9 (58.8)	15.1 (59.2)	11.2 (52.2)	7.1 (44.8)	3.3 (37.9)	−1.4 (29.5)	6.4 (43.5)
Record low °C (°F)	−22 (−8)	−19.4 (−2.9)	−21 (−6)	−9.1 (15.6)	−4.4 (24.1)	0.8 (33.4)	5 (41)	6 (43)	−1.4 (29.5)	−7 (19)	−10 (14)	−18.6 (−1.5)	−22 (−8)
Average precipitation mm (inches)	44.5 (1.75)	42.5 (1.67)	46.4 (1.83)	68.7 (2.70)	87.5 (3.44)	104.3 (4.11)	86.1 (3.39)	73.5 (2.89)	69.0 (2.72)	59.2 (2.33)	47.6 (1.87)	50.6 (1.99)	779.9 (30.70)
Average precipitation days (≥ 1.0 mm)	8.8	7.9	8.0	9.1	11.4	10.7	9.1	6.7	7.9	7.0	7.7	8.3	102.6
Average snowy days	9.3	7	2.9	0.5	0	0	0	0	0	0.1	1.8	5.7	27.3
Mean monthly sunshine hours	73.0	95.0	141.2	180.5	215.3	236.7	267.7	267.4	178.9	154.5	99.5	60.4	1,970.1
Source 1: NOAA
Source 2:

== History ==
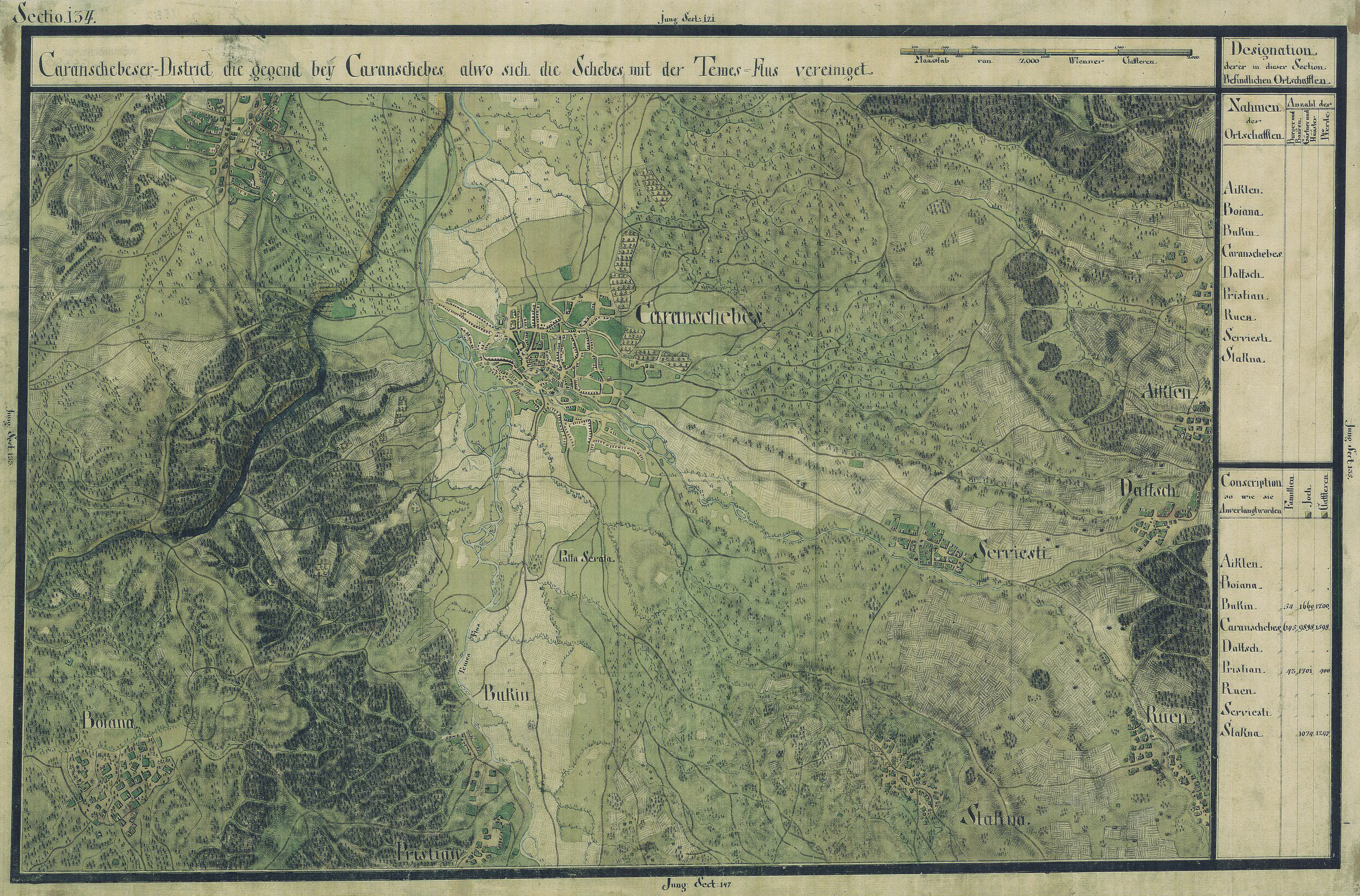
Caransebeș on a map from the 1769-72 survey of the Banat of Temeswar (Josephinian Land Survey)

The first traces of habitation here might date as far as Dacian times. Dacian ruins have been discovered recently near Obreja, a village 7 km away. As the Romans invaded Dacia, they built a castrum named Tibiscum, which was dug up by archaeologists near the nearby village of Jupa, a castrum which later grew to be a full city. Tibiscum is considered one of the gates of Christianity in Dacia, having an important role also in the Romanization of the local people.

During the Middle Ages the area, which remained continuously inhabited, became part of the Hungarian Kingdom. In 1350 it was recorded as the seat of the Romanian district of Sebeș, which later absorbed the district of Caran, forming the district of Caransebeș. In the 16th century it became part of the Eastern Hungarian Kingdom and its successor the Principality of Transylvania, acting as one of the centres of the Banate of Lugos and Karánsebes. In the 17th century it was ceded to the Ottoman Empire, becoming part of the Temeşvar Eyalet. In 1718, after prolonged wars against the Ottomans, the Habsburgs took the control of the region by the Treaty of Passarowitz. It formed part of the Banat of Temeswar crownland until 1751, when it became part of the Banat Military Frontier. In 1788 a self-inflicted defeat, the Battle of Caransebeș, is supposed (the historical accuracy is in doubt) to have taken place here. In 1804 the formally separate Habsburg realms were united into the Austrian Empire. Following the Austro-Hungarian Compromise of 1867 the demilitarisation of the Military Frontier began; Caransebeș became the seat of the short-lived Szörény County of Hungary in 1873, which was then merged with Krassó County in 1881 to form Krassó-Szörény County.

After railroads began to appear, the role of Caransebeș grew continuously. In the late 19th century, the Romanian people of the settlement elected to the Parliament of Hungary the Hungarian Lajos Mocsáry, who was a progressive democratic politician fighting for the cultural and administrative rights of all nationalities (including the Romanians) living in the Hungarian Kingdom of that time.

In late October 1918, near the close of World War I, a Romanian National Committee was established in Caransebeș. It formed the core of the largest Banat delegation to Alba Iulia, where the Union of Transylvania with Romania was proclaimed on December 1. Meanwhile, the entire Banat was occupied by the Serbian Army following the Armistice of Belgrade. The Serbs withdrew from the Caransebeș area in January 1919, and were replaced by the French Army. Romania began administering the Banat in late July, with troops moving in during the following weeks. In August 1919, during the Paris Peace Conference, the Banat was divided between the Kingdom of Serbs, Croats and Slovenes and Greater Romania, with Caransebeș assigned to the latter.

After the rise of the communist regime in 1947, an airport and an airbase were built close to the city. However, the airport did not remain operational for long after the 1989 Revolution.

== Education ==
The city's two leading high schools are the C. D. Loga National College and the Traian Doda National College.

== Demographics ==
Historical population
Year	Pop.	±%
1912	7,999	—
1930	8,704	+8.8%
1948	10,106	+16.1%
1956	15,195	+50.4%
1966	18,194	+19.7%
1977	27,190	+49.4%
1992	31,985	+17.6%
2002	31,199	−2.5%
2011	21,932	−29.7%
2021	21,714	−1.0%
Source: Census data

At the 2021 Romanian census, Caransebeș had a population of 21,714. At the previous census, from 2011, the city had a population of 21,932, mainly Romanians (93.48%), with Ukrainians (1.56%), German (1.17%), and Hungarian (0.78%) minorities present, but in decline.

== Notable people ==
- Dan Alexa (born 1979), football player
- Lucian Buzan (born 1999), football player
- Nicolae Corneanu (1923–2014), Orthodox metropolitan bishop
- Corneliu Dragalina (1887–1949), World War II lieutenant general
- Ion Dragalina (1860–1916), World War I general, commander of the Romanian First Army
- René Fülöp-Miller (1891–1963), Austrian cultural historian and writer
- Sorin Grindeanu (born 1973), politician, Prime Minister of Romania (2017)
- Emanoil Ionescu (1887–1949), World War II squadron general, commander of the 1st Air Corps
- Damian Isac (born 2001), football player
- Gustav Jaumann (1863–1924), Austrian physicist (1863–1924)
- Wilhelm Klein (1850–1924), Hungarian-Austrian archaeologist
- Patricia Maria Țig (born 1994), tennis player

== Literature ==
- Magina, Adrian (2013). "At the Border of Transylvania: the County of Severin/the District of Caransebeș in the 16th-17th Centuries" (PDF). Transylvanian Review: Supplement. 22 (4): 295–306. Archived from the original on 2024-05-23.
