= The Brown Bear of the Green Glen =

Scottish fairy tale

"The Brown Bear of the Green Glen" is a Scottish fairy tale collected by John Francis Campbell in Popular Tales of the West Highlands, listing his informant as John MacDonald, a "Traveling Tinker". He also noted the parallels with The Water of Life.

== Synopsis ==
A king was losing his sight and his ability to walk. His oldest two set out for water to cure him. The youngest son, John, known as a fool, set out too, and found his brothers in the first town. He went on. He climbed a tree to spend the night, but a bear with an ember in its mouth came and got him down by threatening to climb up. The bear caught a deer and fed him the cooked meat. In the morning, it had him ride it. Every night, it had him stay with a giant by saying that the brown bear of the green glen had sent him, but the third giant wrestled with him. As the bear had directed, when the giant had him down, he said that if the brown bear of the green glen were there, it would not go well with him; the bear appeared.

The giant ordered a sheep carcass laid before the door. He told John that an eagle would eat it, and he was to cut the wart from its ear without drawing a drop of blood. The prince did so and the eagle carried him off to the Green Island for the water to cure his father. There, he got the water, and also a whiskey bottle that never emptied, a loaf that grew no smaller when slices were cut off, and a cheese that was the same; he also kissed a sleeping beautiful woman.

The eagle carried him back. He showed the giant the whiskey bottle, and the giant offered him money, a saddle and bridle for it. He agreed, but said the giant must give it to his sweetheart, if she came. The giant agreed. The next two giants, he sold the bread and cheese under the same conditions. He met his brothers in the town and told them to come home, but they set on him to kill him and stole the water. He recovered and called to a smith traveling by, who threw him into his cart. The iron got into his wounds and made him rough-skinned and bald.

The woman John had kissed gave birth to a son. A henwife gave her a bird that would jump to the head of the baby's father on seeing him. She set out, got the whiskey, the cheese, and the bread, and reached the king. She told him what had happened. The king had every man appear before her, but the bird did not jump on any of them. The king demanded if there were anyone else; the smith told of a rough-skinned servant, and John was brought. The bird jumped on him. The king knew him for his son, and asked what should be done to his brothers. John described what they had done to him, and married the princess.

== Source ==
The tale was also collected by Francis Hindes Groome, who noted that it was a variant of The King of England and his Three Sons.

== Analysis ==
=== Tale type ===
In their joint commentaries about the Grimm Fairy Tales, European scholars Johannes Bolte and Jiri Polívka listed the Scottish tale as a variant of German The Water of Life. Both tales are classified in the international Aarne-Thompson-Uther Index as type ATU 551, "The Sons on a Quest for a Wonderful Remedy for their father" or "Water of Life". This tale type concerns a king that is dying or going blind, and sends his three sons to find the only thing that can cure him.

== See also ==
- Leaves of Pearls
- The Fairy Aurora
- Niels and the Giants
- Sleeping Beauty
- The Bird 'Grip'
- The Bold Knight, the Apples of Youth, and the Water of Life
- The King of Erin and the Queen of the Lonesome Island
- The Rider Of Grianaig, And Iain The Soldier's Son
- The Water of Life
