= Langar, Badakhshan =

Langar
- Location in Afghanistan
- Coordinates: 36°44′37″N 71°56′17″E
- Country: Afghanistan
- Province: Badakhshan Province
- District: Wakhan
- Elevation: 9,543 ft (2,909 m)
- Time zone: + 4.30

Langar is a village in the Wakhan District of Badakhshan Province, in north-eastern Afghanistan. It lies on the river Panj, opposite the larger village of Toqakhona in Tajikistan.

The place should not be confused with a seasonal settlement called Langar, also in Wakhan, on the upper Wakhan River, some 130 km east.

== Geography ==
The village lies towards the northern edge of the Hindu Kush mountain range which crosses over into Khyber Pakhtunkhwa in Pakistan and is at an elevation of 9,543 feet (2,909 m).

Langar is situated 1.1 miles (1.8 km) away from Romanit, 3.2 miles (5.1 km) away from Darshai, 0.8 miles (1.3 km) away from Sar Shkhawr and 1.2 miles (1.9 km) away from Shkhawr.

== Transport ==
The nearest airport is 49 nautical miles (91 km) to the north, at Khorugh in Tajikistan.
