= Leaves of Pearls =

Iranian folk tale

Leaves of Pearls (Persian: برگ مرواريد) is an Iranian folktale first collected and published by the author Saiyed Abolqasem Angavi Shirazi. It deals with a prince and his brothers sent on a quest to find a remedy for their ailing father; the cadet prince journeys on until only he finds the remedy from a princess in a distant land, and is betrayed by his elder brothers upon returning with the object; the princess then goes after the one that stole the remedy from her castle.

The tale contains similarities to two tale types of the international Aarne-Thompson-Uther Index, ATU 550, "Bird, Horse and Princess", and ATU 551, "The Water of Life".

== Sources ==
German scholar Ulrich Marzolph sourced the tale from Hamadan.

== Translation ==
Professor Mahomed-Nuri Osmanovich Osmanov translated the tale as "Жемчужный листок" ("Pearl Leaves"), wherein the third prince and hero is named Malek-Mohammed.

== Summary ==
The king of Shahres has three sons by three different wives, and one day starts to lose his sight. A dervish comes to him and says his only cure is the leaves of pearl, but there are three castles where the devs live. The king's three sons offer to go fetch their father's cure, and reach a crossroads where a tablet says that they will perish if they ride together. Warned by the writing on the tablet, the half-brothers decide to go their separate ways, and leave their rings as token of life in case any of them falls in their quest.

The elder two ride together to a city, where they find local work and stay there. As for the youngest, he reaches the castles of the Devs and subdues them, who promise to help him. They guide him to the next castle, and the third Dev offers to take him there: he provides him and the prince with to swift horses they ride to the entrance of the garden, from where the prince has to traverse alone. The prince climbs up a long staircase until he reaches the sleeping chambers of a maiden. He takes a branch of the leaves of pearl next to the maiden, kisses her face, and returns to the Dev.

He goes back through the three Dev castles, and the Devs' sisters go with him. The prince reaches the crossroads with the girls and the leaves of pearl, and decides to look for his elder half-brothers in the nearby city. He pays their debts and buys them finer clothes, and they convene at the crossroads. However, the elder princes, on seeing the girls and the leaves of pearl, comment that their father will favour him and decide to get rid of their cadet by throwing him down a well. Meanwhile, the maiden at the garden wakes up and notices her branch of leaves of pearls is gone, so she utters a magic command to have the garden teleport next to the person that stole her possession.

The next day, the king of Shahres sees the large palace near his city, and sends a slave to inquire about its master. The slave returns and tells the king that the mistress of the palace is the owner of the leaves of pearls, and wants it back. The king summons his elder sons to be questioned by the mistress of the palace, but they are unable to answer how they stole her leaves. The youngest prince appears and tells the whole story to the maiden, who agrees to marry him. The prince punishes his elder brothers and his father, and marries the three Devs' sisters and the owner of the leaves.

== Analysis ==
=== Tale type ===
Professor Osmanov classified the tale as two tale types: AaTh 550, "Quest for the Golden Bird", and AaTh 551, "the Sons on a Quest for a Wonderful Remedy for their Father". (Note: For clarification, German folklorist Hans-Jörg Uther, in his 2004 revision of the international index, renamed type AaTh 550 to ATU 550, "Bird, Horse, and Princess", and type AaTh 551 to ATU 551, "Water of Life".)

Ulrich Marzolph, in his Catalogue of Persian Folktales, classified the tale as its own Iranian type 550, Die neidischen Brüder ("The Jealous Brothers"): the king sends his three sons on a quest either for a cure for his illness, or for a talking bird; the king's youngest son, the hero of the tale, finds the bird or remedy, kisses a sleeping maiden, and returns to his brothers; his elder brothers throw him in a ditch and steal the object to take the credit for the success of the quest; the sleeping maiden, owner of the object, wakes up and goes after the thief. Marzolph listed 9 variants of his tale type across Iranian sources.

The tale contains similarities to two tale types of the international Aarne-Thompson-Uther Index: ATU 550, "Bird, Horse and Princess", and ATU 551, "Water of Life". Scholars Stith Thompson and Hans-Jörg Uther remarked on their similarity of plots and likeness of motifs, which makes it difficult to index as either one type or the other.

== Variants ==
=== Iran ===
==== The Bird Called Flower Trill ====
In an Iranian tale collected by Iranist Arthur Christensen with the title Der Vogel Blumentriller (translated as The Bird Called Flower Trill), a king has three sons, Malik Muhammad, Malik Djamsheed and Malik Ibrahim, the last of which he loves more than the elder two. One day, the king goes blind, and a physician suggests they catch a green fish in the ocean with a golden ring inside it, then cut it into pieces and place them over the king's heart. Some divers catch the fish and deliver it to Malik Ibrahim, who, however, releases the fish back into the sea after seeing a religious inscription on its head. The elder princes use the situation in their benefit, and the king deprives the young prince of his title. Later, the royal physician suggests they find the bird named Flower Trill, which can produce flowers with its songs; if one of its flowers is placed on the king's heart, he shall recover. The three princes reach a crossroads, and go their separate ways in their quest. Malek Ibrahim follows a path fraught with dangers, defeats some beautiful, yet dangerous sorceresses, and rescues a princess of the Peris named Maimune Khatun, whom he marries. After the marriage, Malek Ibrahim continues on his journey to get the bird. With the help of divs, he reaches the garden of Tarfe Banu, the daughter of the Peri King of the Mountain of Qaf. He enters her chambers, steals the bird in its cage, then makes his way with the div's help, and marches back to his kingdom. When he reaches the crossroads, he places the cage up a tree and sleeps for a while. While he rests, his elder brothers return empty-handed from the journey, see the cage and decide to take it with them, stealing the credit for the success of the quest. However, the bird does not chirp on reaching the kingdom, only when Malik Ibrahim returns to the city and goes to the king's presence. The king is cured and crowns the third prince as his heir. One month later, Tarfe Banu sets up a tent outside the city and demands to see who stole her bird. Malik Ibrahim meets up with her, and she declares she will marry him, for he was the one who defeated the witches and made himself master over the bird. Malik Ibrahim marries Tarfe Banu, and sends for his first wife, Maimune Khatun, and they live and rule together.

==== Leaves from the Tutia Tree ====
In a tale from Isfahan, translated into Russian as "Листья дерева тутии" ("Leaves from the Tutia Tree"), the padishah of Chin (a term for "China"), Malek Faghfur, is losing his sight, and his only remedy is the leaves from the Tutia tree that grows on the land of Misr, in the garden of the daughter of the Shah of the Peris. The three princes, Malek Jamshid, Malek Shamshir and Malek Ibrahim, begin the quest: the first two princes stop by a city and play games against a beautiful lady, lose, and are turned into servants; Malek Ibrahim beats the same lady at her game, ousts a cruel ruler, then goes to Misr to find the leaves. He enters the palace of the Shah of the Peris and sees his daughter, deep in sleep, and falls in love with her. Malek Ibrahim takes the leaves with him and goes back to rescue his elder brothers, but they betray him, steal the leaves and throw him inside a well to die.

Later, Ibrahim is rescued by a shepherd and his dog and goes back to Chin, where he discovers his elder brothers have been crowned padishah and vizier, and is tossed in the dungeons. Meanwhile, back in Misr, the Peri princess notices her room has been ransacked and tries to remember the one that did it, since she has seen his visage in a dream, and consulted with the Peri elders about it. The elders foretold her the human prince would come to steal the leaves from the Tutia tree. The princess remembers the elders' prophecy and realizes her beloved was there. She writes a letter to her father to report the situation, and he declares that the human should be punished and Chin reduced to ashes. The princess takes the opportunity to lead her father's army to Chin to see the prince again and punish the one who plucked the leaves from the Tutia tree.

Thus, she takes an army of ghouls, divs and other creatures and stations herself just outside of Chin, and demands to see the thief that stole the leaves from her garden and she will spare the kingdom, lest she reduces everything to cinders. Malek Faghfur asks his son Jamshid to placate the stranger, and he goes to meet the peri princess. He claims to be the one that did it, but cannot produce any evidence of his deed and the princess promptly quarters him and hangs his pieces from the city's walls. The king sends his middle son, Shamshir, to placate the leader of the invading army, and also cannot produce evidence to substantiate his claims, and suffers the same fate. Desperate, Malek Faghfur is convinced to send for his cadet, Ibrahim, who is in the dungeons.

Out of pride, Ibrahim refuses to leave his cell, and is dragged back to the surface. He writes a letter to the peri princess, who is glad to receive it, since she suspects this prince was the one responsible. The peri princess welcomes Ibrahim and asks him if he stole the leaves from the Tutia tree; he admits he did it, and shows her evidence of his presence in her chambers: he mentions a stick, some misplaced shoes, a nightcap, food and drink he touched while he was there, a knot he did on her belt, and a beauty spot on the princess's face. The princess confirms the story and declares she wants to have the knot untied and the beauty spot removed, which Ibrahim agrees to do after they marry. The Shah of the Peris lets his daughter decide about her marriage, and gives his blessings to the couple. Prince Ibrahim and the peri princess marry in a grand celebration, and the human prince inherits both his father's kingdom and the Shah of the Peris'.

==== Leaves of Darkness ====
In an Iranian tale titled "برگ ظلمات" ("Leaves of Darkness"), a king is going blind, and the royal doctor prescribes the leaves of darkness as remedy. The king sends his three sons to fetch him the leaves, and gives them some money for the road. The elder two bet and lose their money on games, and ask their cadet to return home with his money, so that they can forfeit the quest and rule in their father's place when he dies. The youngest prince refuses their offer and continues on his quest, while the elder princes stay at the hostel. The third prince finds a house in the distance where a dev lives, fights him and spares him. The defeated dev directs the prince to his other brothers, also devs, who can help the prince in his quest. The prince defeats the second and third divs, and makes the third div swear on the "red book". The third dev gives the prince instructions to how to reach the land where the leaves of darkness are: walk for seven days and seven nights to the land of darkness, where there is always night and endless darkness, fetch the leaves and leave.

The prince does as instructed, but spots a house in the distance. He climbs the 40 steps, each step holding a pot of gold, and enters a room where forty girls are asleep. One of them has a silver lamp by her feet and a golden lamp by her head. The prince kisses her right cheek and bites lightly the other one, exchanges her clothes, then makes his way back to his brothers. The brothers throw the prince down a well and steal the leaves of darkness for themselves. Some time later, a passerby spots the prince's horse by the well and rescues his rider. The prince dons a lowly disguise and goes back to his home kingdom, where he learns the king's sight has been healed. Back to the owner of the leaves, the princess glues a notice on the wall of the king and demands to know who took her leaves. The king sends his elder son, who lies that he took the leaves, but cannot explain how. The middle one tries to take the credit, but cannot explain the circumstances of his adventure.

Finally, the king learns his cadet is in town and sends for him. The third prince tells his father he was the one that brought the leaves, doffs the lowly disguise, summons the devs by burning their hairs, which they gave him in case he needed their help, and goes to meet the princess. The princess (who is called "لشکرگاه دختر", "Lashkargah Dokhtar" in the original) asks the third prince if it was he that took the leaves of darkness; the prince admits to doing so and explains how he did it. The princess declares she will make him her husband and both report to the king. The king celebrates their wedding and executes his traitorous elder sons.

==== King Deshwar and Prince Ibrahim ====
In a tale collected in Qaradagh, East Azerbaijan, with the title "داستان پادشاه ذشوار و ابراهیم" ("King Deshwar and Prince Ibrahim") and with the Azeri title İBRAHİM VƏ DÜŞVAR PADŞAH ("Ibrahim and Dushvar Padshah"), King Deshwar has a son named Ibrahim, whose mother dies to a disease. One day, while walking on the beach, king and prince find some aquatic horses coming out of the sea with their black-coated foal in tow. Prince Ibrahim spots the black foal and wants to have it, to which the king consents. Ibrahim and the black foal become good friends, they grow up together, and Ibrahim goes to school. The king is also a widower, and married a second queen that hates her stepson. Her grudge grows over time, until she tells the king she wants the prince killed. The king disagrees with the idea, but the queen says she will do the deed herself. First, she digs up a well near the entrance to the palace and covers it with a carpet, as a trap for the prince to fall into. When the prince returns from school, he goes to meet the black foal, which warns him about the well. Thus, Ibrahim escapes by jumping over the carpet, and lies that he was taught so in school. The queen orders the hole to be filled with earth, and moves to another attempt: poisoning his food. The black horse warns the prince again: the prince feeds a pet cat with some of the food and avoids eating the dish. The king and queen set their sights on the black horse, since they suspect the horse is warning the prince. The next day, prince Ibrahim meets his equine friend and finds him in tears, since, this time, it is its life that is at stake, for the queen's doctor prescribed the liver of a sea horse to cure her. The horse then informs that it will whinny three times to alert Ibrahim, when they are guiding it to the yard to be sacrificed, and they bribed the schoolteacher to hold him at school. Ibrahim fears to the horse, but attends school. During schooltime, he hears the whinnies and wants to leave to help his foal friend, but the teacher forbids him. Still, the prince disobeys and runs away from school to assist the foal. He jumps on his horse and asks him to be killed with the horse. The vizier and the lawyer advise the king to simply banish the prince from the kingdom.

Prince Ibrahim is exiled with his foal friend and reaches another kingdom, where he finds a garden. He asks for the garden-keeper to worked there and is hired as a helper. The horse asks Ibrahim to let it loose, and gives him some hairs from its mane, for him to summon the horse when he needs it. The prince works for his employer, to the latter's happiness. The man has two daughters, and the eldest wishes to marry Ibrahim. Her father consents. One day, the king's officials come to talk to Ibrahim's father-in-law for reinforcements to the local king's army to fight in a war. Ibrahim offers to go to war and promises to return safely. At a distance, he rubs two of his horse's hairs to summon it, commissions a sharp sword from the blacksmith and rides into battle. From his position, he defeats the enemy troops on his black horse. The local king does not recognize Ibrahim and sends an envoy to inquire him about his origins and prowess. Ibrahim is brought before the king and asked about his abilities, when they receive news about the enemy army entering from the other side. Ibrahim rides to the other side of the battlefield and defeats the remaining army. The king admires Ibrahim's martial prowess and wishes that they have such black horses in his army and make Ibrahim king. Ibrahim thanks the king for the offer, but wants to return to his homeland: the province of King Deshwar.

The local king gives his blessing to Ibrahim, who takes his wife and returns home with his wife to his homeland. HE pitches a tent with his black horse on the outskirts of the town. King Deshwar's officials sight Ibrahim, who they do not recognize, and approach him. Ibrahim's wife says that men are coming for him, and Ibrahim welcomes his father's officials, but cuts the ear of an envoy and issues an ultimatum for his father: either his father kills his wife and bring her head, otherwise there will be war. King Deshwar refuses to kill his second wife, and sends his army to the battlefield. Ibrahim defeats and kills his father's army and repeats his ultimatum, promising to spare his father, but he still wants the queen to die by his father's own hands. With no alternative, King Deshwar kills his wife and sends her head to Ibrahim. Prince Ibrahim tells his father that his father will reign and he will make the country prosperous.

Years later, Ibrahim becomes king, marries a second wife, and has children with each wife: a son by the first wife, called Muhammad, and two sons by the second, called Ali and Hussein. At one time, when Ibrahim is reorganizing the realm to his liking and has built a magnificent palace, a local old woman says that the palace is incredible, but it needs a peacock to sing in the city. Ibrahim's three sons decide to look for the bird for their father, and depart on a journey: on the road, his two half-brothers choose a road, while prince Muhammad goes through another road. Muhammad meets an old man that gives him directions: there is a forest, with a large spring and a large plane tree where a skull castle where a humay bird lives with its chicks, which are devoured every year by a dragon, so he is to kill the dragon and ensure the humay bird's help to find the peacock, which is in the possession of a lady that lives in the sun's sphere. Prince Muhammad breaks into the lady's castle, unties thirty-nine of her clothes, steals the peacock and returns to the humay bird. The lady wakes up in her castle, discovers the bird is gone, and takes her lion's army to King Ibrahim's realm to punish the thief. Meanwhile, Muhammad goes to help his brothers by buying their freedom, and in return they throw Muhammad in a well and steal the peacock to take credit for the deed.

=== Kurdish people ===
A similar story also exists in the folktale corpus of the Kurdish people. According to the Catalogue of Kurdish Folktales, in tale type 550, "Der Zaubervogel" ("The Magic Bird"), a king sends his three sons to capture and bring him the magic bird; the elder brothers enter a city where they become lowly servants, while the third prince journeys on and is directed to the bird with the help of a holy man, a giant or another type of helper; he discovers the bird with the Fairy King's daughter, kisses her cheek in her sleep, and absconds with the bird; he meets his brothers en route to their homeland, but his brothers throw him in a fountain and steal the bird; the third brother is rescued by a farmer; back to the Fairy King's daughter, she wakes up, finds that the bird is stolen and her cheek has been kissed, so she goes after the person who did so.

==== The Zay Tree and the Tay Falcon ====
Orientalist Wheeler Thackston collected a Kurdish tale titled The Zay Tree and the Tay Falcon. In this tale, a king has three sons, two from a first wife, and the third from a second wife. He is also going blind, and only the titular zay tree and tay falcon can cure him, located in the city of fairies, guarded by demons and beyond Mount Qaf. The three sons each depart on a journey, and the youngest reaches a city whose leader proposes a riddle for him regarding the behaviour of living things being defined by nature or nurture, using cats as an example. He answers it wrong and flees the city to a cave in the mountains, where he releases a maiden from a demon and obtains a magic box that summons two magic slaves. The third prince continues on his quest and reaches a second city, whose king and army he defeats with the help of the magic slaves and makes them convert from "fire-worshipping" to Islamism. He finally reaches a large mountain and orders his slaves to bring him a steel stake, pegs, hammers, and a rope, then climbs the mountain to the other side where he reaches a palace. He climbs down the rope and arrives at a room full of guardian dogs and horses, and trades their fodder (straw for the horses, bone for the dogs), kept the former way so that they would always be hungry and sound against intruders. The third prince, next, arrives at the door to the location of the tree and the falcon, decorated with bells. Summoning the slaves, he produces pieces of cotton to muffle the alarm bells, and enters the chambers of an asleep queen of the fairies. He kisses her on the cheek, and a blue mark appears on her face. He also switch the positions of four lamps around the queen, unties 39 of 40 knots on her pants, takes the tree and falcon and summons his slaves to bring him to the top of the palace.

After giving the treasures to the slaves for safekeeping, the prince returns to the first city, and is asked again the riddle of nature or nurture, and rigs the challenge by letting loose mice for the cats to catch. The king, admitting defeat, takes off his disguise and reveals she is a woman. The prince realizes his elder brothers must have come to the same city and died, but the she-king assures it is not so, and sends for the elder princes, imprisoned in the dungeons. The prince then goes to fetch the woman at the cave, and the group make their way to their homeland, the girls ahead, while the three princes follow behind them. While the girls are at a distance, the elder princes stab their cadet and leave him for dead in a river, and take the tree and falcon for themselves. Back to the queen of the fairies, she wakes up from her slumber and notices that someone has come to her room, since the zay tree and the tay falcon are not there. She then summons her fairy and demon sergeants to search high and low for the man who did that. Her journey takes her to the city of the blind king, where many people claim the success of the quest, but cannot verify the details of how they retrieved the tree and the falcon. The third prince, who was rescued and nursed back to health by a miller, appears to the queen of the fairies at last and tells her how he bypassed the guards. The queen of the fairies marries the third prince, and he, out of respect for their father, decides to forgive his elder brothers.

==== Usuf Shah and his Brothers, Gul and Simo ====
Orientalist Hellmut Ritter collected a Kurmanji tale from a source in Tur Abdin. In this tale, titled Ūsufşā und seine Brüder, Gul u Sīmō (English: "Usuf Shah and his Brothers, Gul and Simo"), a sultan has three sons, ‘Amarshah, Fēlūshah and Usufshah. One day, he is going blind, and the royal seers, divining through the sand, prescribe that only the golden doves that eat golden grains on a golden plate are the cure, for, if they coo near the sultan's eye, he will recover his sight. The elder princes Amarshah and Felushah ride on a quest for the doves and reach a three-way crossroad where an old dervish stands. The dervish explains that the paths lead to Aleppo, Istanbul and a third to the place of going or not returning. The elder princes divert their way and go to Aleppo. Back to Usufshah, the young prince, he journeys after his brothers and meets the same dervish, whose beard he grooms. In return, the old man warns Usufshah about the Black Dev the prince will find on his journey. Usufshah meets and defeats three Devs, the Black one, the Red one, and lastly the White one, releasing three captives, three sisters. In gratitude, the third princess advises him where he can find the pair of doves: he will ride directly into fierce animal guardians (lions, panthers and snakes), then he will reach a castle, where he is to open a close door and close an open one, exchange the fodder between two animals (meat for a lion, hay for a mare), and finally he will find the owner of the doves, a maiden named Bnafschanārîn; the prince is to climb over her, fetch the doves and rush away, since the maiden's servants and palace will alert her. The prince follows the instructions, gets the doves and rushes back. He then goes to collect the Dev's prisoners, and the group make their way to the dervish, who the prince asks to look after the girls, for he will go to Aleppo. Usufshah enters Aleppo, finds out his brothers have been made into servants, and buys their freedom back.

The group make their way to Baghdad, their homeland, and the elder princes decide to betray their cadet and take the credit for the quest: they dump him in a well and steal the doves, but the birds do not coo, for their master is not present. Usufshah is rescued by a shepherd, returns to the city and dons a sheep's skin on his head as a disguise. Just as the third prince comes to the city, the birds begins to coo. Later, a pasha (Bnafschanārîn, in male disguise) appears in the outskirts of the city with tents and their army, demanding the thief that stole the golden doves. The elder princes are taken to the pasha and spin a false story which he does not believe. When Usufshah is brought to the pasha, he mentions that he ate an apple from a plate in Bnafschanārîn's chambers, which the pasha confirms, since they are Bnafschanārîn, and offers to marry the prince. Usufshah marries Bnafschanārîn and the maiden he rescued from the White Dev, but on the wedding night, Bnafschanārîn asks Usufshah to tell her the story of Gul and Simo, as the tale continues as another tale type.

==== Ahmed and Fazuhur ====
In a Kurdish tale titled Aẖmad ū Fāzúẖur, translated as Ahmed and Fazuhur, a king has two wives and three sons, two from the first one and a third from the second one. The third prince opens up a shop. In time, the king becomes ill, and the doctors cannot cure him, so they consult the sixteen houses of geomancy for the remedy: the pomegranates from the garden of Fazuhur, located at the distance of a seven years' journey. The king asks his elder sons, Mahmud and Ali, to make an announcement through the city for anyone to fetch the pomegranates of Fazuhur's garden. However, the elder princes offer to fetch them for their father. The youngest prince also learns of their half-brothers' quest and decides to join them, by riding his own wind and storm horse. They go their separate ways: the elder brothers ride to two different roads and find normal pomegranates, believing them to be the right ones. As for the third prince, he arrives at a tree where the Simurg's nest lies; he kills a dragon that is menacing its chicks, when mother Simurg flies in and threatens the prince. The chick Simurgs vouch for the human, saying that he protected them, and mother Simurg promises to help the prince by carrying him across to the edge of Fazuhur's garden. The prince arrives at the garden, and the Simurg advises the prince to reach a red seal on a door, where he is to utter the Name of God; the gate will open and he will reach the pomegranate tree with the fruits. The prince does as instructed, reaches the tree and pockets some fruits. However, he notices a tent in the garden with some bells. He enters the tent, lifts the entrance to seven tents and finds a beautiful maiden asleep. The prince inverts the position of the lamps located near the maiden by moving the lamp near the head to the legs and the one near the legs to the head, eats some portions of the food, lifts the maiden's veil to kiss her cheek, and departs back to the Simurg. The Simurg carries the prince back to its nest and the prince makes his way back to his brothers.

The prince meets his brothers and shows them the true pomegranates, and they make their way home. The cadet prince goes to say his prayers, when the older brothers plan to kill their half-brother and steal the pomegranates: while deep in prayer, the elder princes stab him a hundred times with a dagger, throw his body in a ditch, take the pomegranates and return home. The mother of the third prince, Melik Ahmed, asks the elder princes if they saw their younger brother, and lie that he has not returned with them. As for Melik Ahmed, a ploughman and his wife find the fatally injured prince while they are fetching water to drink, and carry him home. The ploughman brings a doctor to treat the stranger and promises to pay him five hundred golden lira. The doctor works his treatments on the stranger, who wakes up and reveals he is a prince. Melik Ahmed is healed after a fortnight, and promises to reward the ploughman as king in his father's place. Melik Ahmed saddles a horse and returns home to his mother, where he lays in waiting. Back to Fazuhur, she wakes up in her tent, looks in the mirror and sees the kiss mark on her cheek. She screams in horror, and her father, the Islam Shah of the Peris arrives with twelve thousand troops. Fazuhur asks her father to find the one who entered her garden in ten days' time, and the Islam Shah of the Peris traverse the world with his army of demons and peris, asking around. At last he consults with the bird Simurg, who retells how it helped a prince enter the garden. The Islam Shah of the Peris then takes his entire army and surround the country of Basra, and writes a letter to the local king to send the person who dared venture into Fazuhur's garden by himself. The king sends the elder brother, who is asked about the circumstances of his theft of the pomegranates. For answering wrong, the Islam Shah knocks him down. The same fate befalls the middle brother.

Worried about his country, the king pleads with his youngest son, Melik Ahmed, to face the Shah of the Peris. Melik Ahmed is questioned about his adventures, and reveals he travelled seven years' journey of distance, entered the garden with large walls, and kissed Fazuhur's face. Satisfied, the Shah of Peris drugs the prince with a drugged drink, locks him in a chest and brings him to his daughter, Fazuhur, for her to deal with him. Fazuhur releases the prince, admires his beauty, but sends him to her father for him to decide. The Shah of Peris asks his daughter to deal with him, since he is her enemy, but Fazuhur sends him on an errand: to discover the truth of the person named Ahmed the Carefree. Melik Ahmed goes on another journey, obtains three magical objects to reach the land of Ahmed the Carefree to learn the reason for his appellation, then returns to the garden of Fazuhur to marry his queen. For a final personal task, Melik Ahmed returns home after his father died, exiles his elder brothers, makes the ploughman king, just as he promised, and returns to the garden of Fazuhur.

=== Sistan ===
In a tale collected by Russian philologist Aleksandr Gryunberg-Tsvetinovich and philologist Mikhail Ivanovich Steblin-Kamensky in Sistan with the title "Лист сорокаустого дерева" ("Leaf from the Magpie Tree"), a king has three sons, two by a first wife and one, the youngest, named Malik-Muhammad, by a second wife. One day, the king is losing his sight until he eventually goes blind. The king's soothsayers prescribe that only the leaf from the magpie tree can cure him. The elder princes depart in secret. Their cadet, Malik-Muhammad, asks his father the reason for the elders' departure, and is told about the cure for the king. The youth, then, decides to join his brothers, who make him their servant (he cooks their food and grazes their horses). One day, they reach a crossroads and go their separate ways: the elder two to the right and Malik-Muhammad to the left. The elder two reach a house where they spend the night, and play games with an expert female player, losing the bets and becoming their servants. Meanwhile, Malik-Muhammad meets three female diva sisters and, with their help, learns of the location of the tree with such leaves: the castle of the Peri King, where his daughter, the princess-pari, lives. The elder diva sister warns him that, if he approaches the Peri King's horse, tied next to the tree, it will neigh and alert the tree, which will sound and wake the sleeping princess pari, who will leave her room to check on the items and scold them; as soon as she leaves, the prince is to pet the horse and say soothing words to the horse and the tree, earning their trust in the process; then, he is to climb 40 stairs to the princess's room, steal one of her seven veils as a memento.

The prince reaches the castle and the events unfold as the diva predicted: the prince, in the princess's room, steals one of her gem-encrusted veils and kisses her, then goes to the garden, steals a leaf of the tree, and rides back to the crossroads. At the crossroads, he notices his brothers' daggers (which they stabbed the tree with to serve as tokens) are rusty, indicating they are in trouble. Malik-Muhammed makes his way to the city where his elder half-brothers are and releases them from their servitude by betting with the female player and winning. Malik-Muhammad sends a caravan with the leaves of the magpie tree ahead of him, along with potential brides for his brothers, while he rides with his half-brothers. At one time, the brothers fill a flask with fresh water to drink, and agree to give some to Malik if he puts out both of his eyes. The youth agrees to their ghastly deal, takes out his eyes (which his brothers toss to Malik's pet hound), and abandons him on the road, then steals the magical leaves for themselves and heal their father, the king. Meanwhile, the princess-pari wakes up in her castle and notices that her room has been rummaged, her diva guardians in the stairs have been killed, and the leaves from her tree have been stolen. Realizing only one brave enough could traverse such perils, she decides to have him as her husband, so she summons an army of divas to search everywhere for him, until she stops just outside Malik-Muhammad's city walls with her palace, and demands the thief appears to her, lest she makes the entire city to cinders. The compilers classified the tale as types AaTh 550 and AaTh 551.

=== Wakhi people ===
Philologists Aleksandr Gryunberg-Tsvetinovich and Mikhail Ivanovich Steblin-Kamensky collected a tale from a Wakhi informant that lived in Shkhawr, Afghanistan, with the title "Царица с Волосами в Сорок Гязов" ("The Queen with the Forty-Gyaz Hair"), which was translated into French language as La reine eux cheveux long de quarante gazes. In this tale, a king has three beloved sons from a first wife, and one that he hates from a second wife. One night, he sends a maid to hear what they are talking about: the three elder are asleep, while the youngest mentions about a Pearl that Shines in the Night, located in Mount Kof. The maid reports back to the king and he decides to send his three elder sons after the pearl, in fine horses, and the youngest with a lame mount. The four princes reach a crossroads, and go their separate ways: the elder three to the safe road that allows return, and the youngest to the road of not returning. The fourth prince finds and defeats a Black Div, a White Div and a Red Div. After saving another king, the grateful monarch tells him that the prince needs to reach the Simurgh, a large bird that lives in a tree, but its chicks are always menaces by a multiheaded dragon. With this advice, the prince traverses steppes and deserts until he reaches the Simurgh's nest and kills the multiheaded dragon to protect its nestlings. The Simurgh, in return, agrees to take him up Mount Kof, in exchange for feeding the bird with meat.

On the aerial journey there, the prince feeds the bird part of his flesh when the meat is not enough, and, after landing, the Simurgh restores the prince's flesh. Finally in Mount Kof, the prince goes in search of the objects of his quest: the White Falcon and the Night-Shining Pearl, at the hands of the Queen with the Forty-Gyaz Hair (gyaz being a measurement unit). The Simurgh also advises him to compliment a scorched garden and insult a blooming garden by saying the opposite of what they are; compliment a crooked bridge and a crooked gate; exchange the fodder of two animals (hay for a horse, bones for a dog); lastly, when he reaches the Queen's room, he is to tie strands of her hair to 40 pillars in her room, switch two pearls' positions (move the one near her head to her feet, and vice-versa), exchange the positions between 40 pairs of her undergarments (the ones on the bottom are to be brought to the top, and vice-versa). The Simurgh then departs, and the prince follows the bird's advice to the letter, avoiding the dangers until he enters the Queen's chambers. After applying the Simurgh's instructions to the Queen's bed, he steals a set of keys, opens 40 rooms and finds the falcon and the pearl, and hurries back. Suddenly, the Queen wakes up and commands her servants to deter him, but the animals and objects refuse to do so, due to the prince's actions. The prince returns to a waiting Simurgh, which takes him back to the Div. The prince makes his way back to the crossroads and rides down the road where his brothers went down before, arriving at a city where they have become lowly servants.

== See also ==
- The Bird 'Grip'
- The Bold Knight, the Apples of Youth, and the Water of Life
- The Fairy Aurora
- The King of England and his Three Sons
- The Water of Life (German fairy tale)
