= The King of England and his Three Sons =

Romani fairy tale

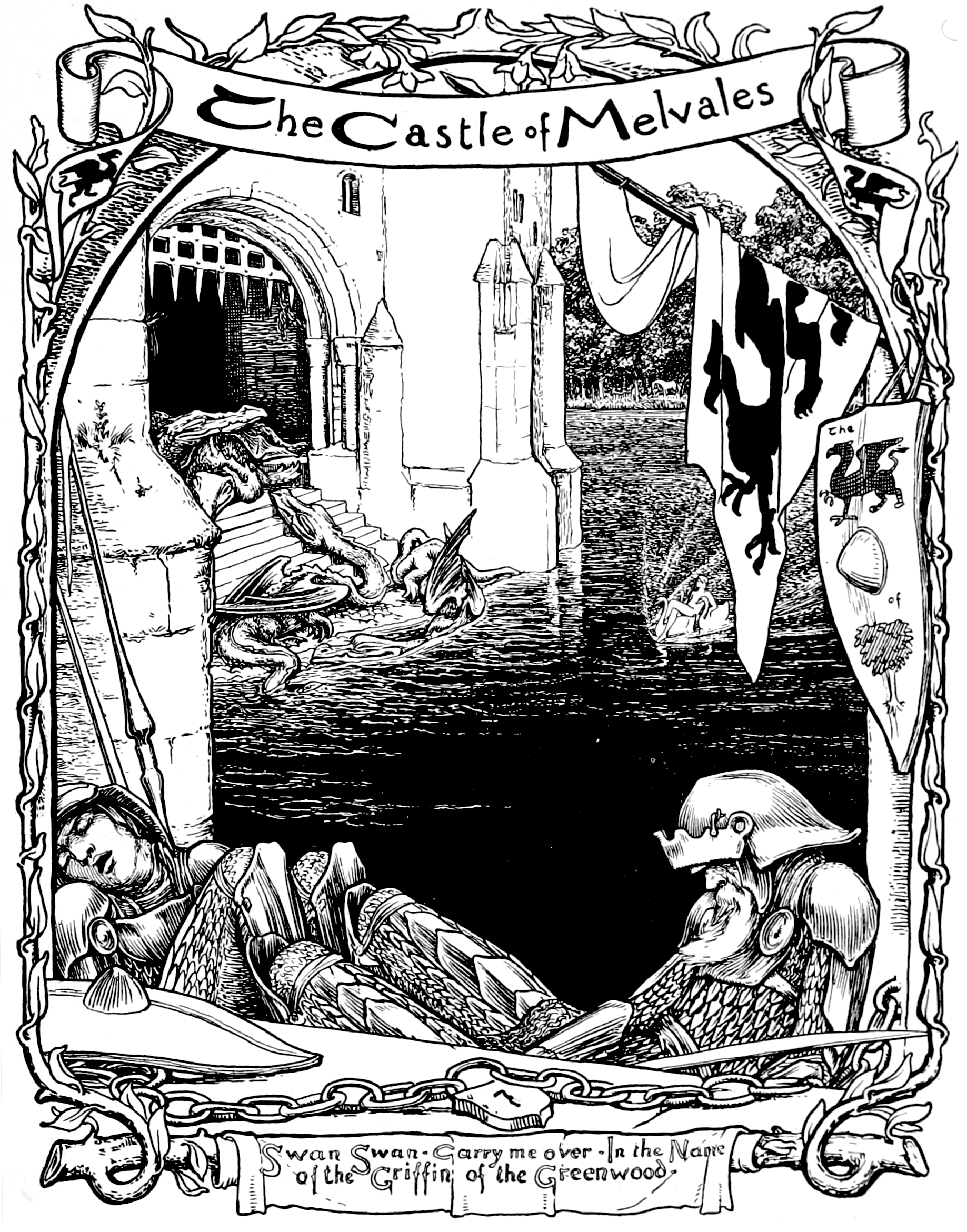
- The Castle of Melvales (by John D. Batten)

Folk tale
- Name: The King of England and his Three Sons
- Also known as: An Old King and His Three Sons of England
- Aarne–Thompson grouping: ATU 551
- Mythology: Romani
- Country: England

The King of England and his Three Sons is a Romani fairy tale collected by Joseph Jacobs in More English Fairy Tales. He listed as his source Francis Hindes Groome's In Gypsy Tents, where the informant was John Roberts, a Welsh Roma. It deals with a prince and his brothers sent on a quest to find a remedy for their father; the cadet prince journeys on until only he finds the remedy from a princess in a distant land, and is betrayed by his elder brothers upon returning with the object; the princess then goes after the one that stole the remedy from her castle.

The tale is classified in the international Aarne-Thompson-Uther Index as type ATU 551, "The Water of Life".

== Publication ==
Joseph Jacobs reprinted the tale from Francis Hindes Groome's In Gypsy Tents, where the informant's name was given as John Roberts, a Welsh Roma. Groome published the tale as An Old King and his three Sons in England.

A version of this tale appears in The Red King and the Witch: Gypsy Folk and Fairy Tales by Ruth Manning-Sanders, under the title An Old King and His Three Sons of England. It was also republished as How Jack Sought the Golden Apples.

== Synopsis ==
An old king could be cured only by golden apples from a far country. His three sons set out to find them, and parted ways at a crossroads. The youngest son found a house in a forest, where an old man greeted him as a king's son, and told him to put his horse in the stable and have something to eat. After the meal, he asked how the man knew he was a king's son, and the man said he knew many things, including what the prince was doing. He told the prince that he had to stay there the night, though many snakes and toads would crawl over him, and if he stirred, he would turn into one himself.

The prince got little sleep but did not stir. In the morning, the old man gave him breakfast, a new horse, and a ball of yarn to throw between the horse's ears. When the prince threw it and chased it, he came to the old man's brother, who was uglier than the first one. He received the same hospitality, and the same unpleasant night, and this brother sent him on to the third brother.

At the third brother's, the brother, who was even uglier than the second one, told him he must go on to a castle. There, he must tell swans to bear him over the lake to a castle. It was guarded by giants, lions, and dragons, but they would be asleep, and so he must go in at one o'clock and come out again by two. He must go through some grand rooms, go down into the kitchen, and then go out into the garden. There he must pick the apples. He should come back the same way, and when riding off, never look back because they would pursue him until he nearly reached the old man's house.

He went to bed, and this time the brother assured him that nothing would disturb him, and nothing did. In the morning, the old man warned him not to tarry because of a beautiful woman.

He reached the castle by the swans and saw a beautiful woman there. He exchanged his garter, gold watch, and pocket-handkerchief for hers, and kissed her. Then he got the apples and had to flee with all speed, because the hour was nearly up, but he escaped.

The old man brought him to a well and insisted that the prince cut the old man's head off and throw it into the well. This turned him into a young, handsome man, and the house into a palace. At the second brother's, he received a new bed, with no snakes or toads, and cut off his head as well, and then the same with the first.

He met up with his brothers again. They stole his apples and put others in their place, and went on before him. When he reached home, his apples were not as good as his brother's, and his father thought they were poisoned and told his headsman to cut his head off. The headsman instead took him into the woods and left him there. A bear came up to him, and he climbed a tree, but the bear persuaded him to come down. The bear brought him to some tents, where they made him welcome, and changed in a handsome young man, Jubal. He stayed with them and was happy, although he had lost the golden watch somewhere. One day, he saw it in the tree where he had climbed to hide from the bear, and climbed it to get it again.

Meanwhile, the princess, realizing one of the king's sons had been there, set out with an army. When she reached the king, she demanded to see his sons. When the oldest came, he said he had been to her castle, but when she threw down the handkerchief and he walked over it, he broke his leg; then the second brother said the same, but also broke his leg. She demanded of the king whether he had more sons; the king sent to the headsman, who confessed he had not killed the prince, and the king said he must find him, to save the king's life. They found Jubal, who pointed to the tree where the prince was, and they told the prince he must come because a lady was looking for him, and they brought Jubal with them. He did not break his leg over the handkerchief, and the princess knew he was the prince, so they married, and went back to her castle.

== Analysis ==
=== Tale type ===
The tale is classified in the international Aarne-Thompson-Uther Index as type ATU 551, "The Sons on a Quest for a Wonderful Remedy for their father" or "Water of Life". This tale type concerns a king that is dying or going blind, and sends his three sons to find the only thing that can cure him. English folklorist Katherine Mary Briggs, in her Dictionary of British Folk-Tales, classified it as type ATU 551. In the same vein, American folklorist D. L. Ashliman, in his 1987 guide to folktales, classified the story as type 551, "The Quest for the Water of Life".

=== Motifs ===
Jacobs noted the king with three sons was a common motif, and that the Sleeping Beauty-like character is found in Perrault.

In several variants, the object that can cure the king (a magical water, an enchanted bird or wonderful fruits) belongs to a foreign princess or fairy maiden in a distant kingdom. At the end of the tale, the fairy maiden or foreign princess travels with her army or navy to the prince's kingdom in order to find the man who stole her wonderful bird or magical water.

== Variants ==
Groome reported another Welsh-Romani variant titled I Valín Kalo Pāni (sic) ("The Bottle of Black Water"), wherein the golden apples are replaced for the titular bottle of black water as the king's remedy. The tale was eventually published in the journal of the Gypsy Lore Society, from the collection of John Sampson. In this tale, titled Valin Kōlō Pānī ("The Bottle of Black Water"), a king is ill, and sends his sons for the bottle of black water, which is his only remedy. The two elder brothers let the youngest, Jack, go on the quest alone. An old man gives Jack a ride and directs him to a lake, where he is to command a swan to take him across the water. Inside the castle, everyone is asleep, and Jake lays in bed with a princess. He steals her two garters and the bottle of black water, and leaves. Jack meets his brothers and presents them the bottle. While he rests, his brothers exchange the bottle for a flask of another liquid. When Jack and his brothers return to his father, the elder brothers take the credit for the deed, and Jack is expelled from the kingdom for failing the quest. Jack lives in the woods, his beard and hairs grown over time. The princess visits Jack's father and his brothers to discover who took the bottle of black water from her. She identifies Jack as the one responsible and marries him. William Reginald Halliday, in his commentaries to the tale, related the story to the German tale Der Wasser des Lebens ("The Water of Life"), collected by the Brothers Grimm.

== Adaptations ==
English novelist Alan Garner adapted the tale as The Castle of Melvales, in his book Alan Garner's Book of British fairy tales. His version names the princes Oliver, Valentine and Jack.

== See also ==
- Leaves of Pearls
- Niels and the Giants
- The Bold Knight, the Apples of Youth, and the Water of Life
- The Brown Bear of the Green Glen
- The Golden Bird
- The King of Erin and the Queen of the Lonesome Island
- The Rider Of Grianaig, And Iain The Soldier's Son
- The Water of Life
- Ibong Adarna
- The Fairy Aurora
