= Doamna Stanca National College (Satu Mare) =

School in Satu Mare, Romania

- Colegiul Național Doamna Stanca

Location
- Ștefan cel Mare Street, Nr. 5 Satu Mare, Satu Mare County; Romania
- Coordinates: 47.79479°N 22.87408°E

Information
- Funding type: Public
- Established: 1816; 210 years ago
- Principal: Nicoleta Kichel
- Staff: 52
- Grades: 5–12
- Age range: 10–18
- Enrollment: ca. 700
- Classes: 28
- Average class size: 25
- Language: Romanian
- Website: www.cndssm.com

Doamna Stanca National College (Romanian: Colegiul Național Doamna Stanca) is a public day high school for students aged 10 to 18, established in 1816, and located in Satu Mare, Romania. The school is named after the spouse of the Romanian ruler Michael the Brave. The Doamna Stanca National College is one of four national colleges located in Satu Mare, alongside Mihai Eminescu, Ioan Slavici, and Kölcsey Ferenc.

The Romanian writer Ioan Slavici took his baccalaureate at this college.

== History ==
After 1804, with the establishment of the Roman Catholic Diocese of Satu Mare, the Catholic gymnasium was reopened. The institution functioned in a rented space from the former Jesuit college that was damaged. In the year 1814, the construction plans for a new gymnasium were approved and the costs of the construction were supported by the Roman Catholic Bishopric. The city provided land for the construction and placement of the structure for only 5,000 Hungarian forints. The teaching language in the Catholic secondary school was Latin. Since 1819, there have been efforts to teach the Hungarian language as an object of study. From 1833, grammar, arithmetic, and religion, starting with the third class were taught in the Hungarian language. Between 1843 and 1844, the main language was Hungarian, but Latin continued to be an important teaching language.

The German language was introduced in 1855, as an object of study in all secondary classes. From the fifth grade, many educational courses were taught in German; even Latin and Greek were taught by German textbooks. The Romanian population attend the elementary schools confessional in English, but there were secondary studies in Latin and Hungarian. One of the most famous professors to teach at the college was the Romanian priest and an advocate Vasile Lucaciu.

== Present ==
The school has 24 high school classes (A through F) and 4 secondary school classes. Usually the "A" classes are specialized on social sciences sometimes with an English bilingual specialization. The "B" classes treat Modern Languages always having either an English or a French/German bilingual specialization. The "C" classes have the natural sciences specialization along with an English bilingual one. The "D" classes are natural sciences, the "E" classes have mathematics and science and the "F" classes are Greek catholic theology classes, none of the latter three having any bilingual specialization. All of the high school classes have intensive learning science according to their specialization.
