= Mihai Eminescu National College (Satu Mare) =

High school in Romania

- Colegiul Național Mihai Eminescu

Location
- Strada Mihai Eminescu, Nr. 5 Satu Mare, Satu Mare County; Romania
- Coordinates: 47.7896°N 22.8763°E

Information
- Funding type: Public
- Established: 1634; 392 years ago
- Founder: Society of Jesus
- Principal: Liviu Rotaru
- Staff: 72
- Grades: 5–12
- Age range: 10–18
- Enrollment: c. 930
- Classes: 32
- Average class size: 25
- Language: Romanian
- Website: www.eminescusm.ro

Mihai Eminescu National College (Romanian: Colegiul Național Mihai Eminescu) is a public day high school for students aged 10 to 18, established in 1634 by the Jesuits, and located at 5 Mihai Eminescu Street, Satu Mare, Romania.

In 1919, the school is named after the great Romanian poet Mihai Eminescu, being the first high school in Transylvania bearing the name of the poet. The Mihai Eminescu National College is one of the four national colleges located in Satu Mare, alongside Ioan Slavici, Kölcsey Ferenc, and Doamna Stanca.

== History ==
The high school was established in 1634 when Jesuits received approval to open a college in Satu Mare. The new institution was supported by an act issued in 1639 in Vienna by Holy Roman Emperor Ferdinand III. It operated according to the pedagogical principles of the Ratio studiorum, with few exceptions until 1804 when a decree was given by the Holy Roman Emperor Francis I that states the college will be supported through state funds. Also in 1804 the school established a bishop college in 1850 which later merged with the gymnasium. Based on an energetic approach of the Roman Catholic Bishop the gymnasium was taken over by the state in 1863 and decreed a royal Catholic secondary school – gimnazium regium.

Although this school taught young students belonging to all ethnic groups in this land, it is noteworthy that the majority of students have always been Romanians. The teaching language has been changed in the evolution of the college, from Latin to Hungarian and then to German and finally to Romanian. Centuries of injustice suffered by the Romanians were repaired since July 15, 1919 when the Mihai Eminescu high school was founded, the first institution of secondary education with Romanian language teaching in the town of Satu Mare.

== Present ==
The school has 28 high school classes and 4 secondary school classes. The classes have different specializations: mathematics and science, natural sciences, social sciences, and modern languages. Some classes are bilingually specialized: English and French, and others are in intensive learning science.

== Alumni ==
- Corneliu Chisu
- Mircea Florian
- Simona Pop
- Mircea Zaciu

== See also ==
- List of Jesuit sites
