= Niels and the Giants =

Danish fairy tale

"Niels and the Giants" is a Danish fairy tale. Andrew Lang included it in The Crimson Fairy Book.

== Synopsis ==
A couple had two sons. The older was content to be a shepherd like his father, but the younger, Niels, wanted to be a hunter. He got a gun, practiced with it, and became a good shot. The mother decided she wanted to go on a pilgrimage to Rome. The family sold everything they own and set out; Niels brought the gun. One night, they did not stay at an inn because the heat had made them go slowly that day, and the moon was up. They came to a crossroads in the forest and did not know which way to go. They decided to stay there. In the first watch, the older son shot a stag; in the second, the younger climbed a tree and saw three giants. They were eating, and by careful shots, he had them quarrel about knocking each other's hands and making them prick themselves with the forks. The third giant realized he was about and caught him.

They demanded a service of him. They wished to carry off the king's daughter, and had put everyone to sleep in the castle except a little black dog. If he shot the dog so it did not bark and wake everyone, they would spare his life. They threw him in and he landed on grass. He shot the dog and went to the gate, but on the way, he saw an enormous sword, a drinking horn, and an inscription saying that whoever drank from the horn could wield the sword. He looked through the castle and found the princess. He took half her handkerchief and one of her slippers. Then he drained the horn and could wield the sword. He went to the gate, where there was a small door and a large door. He opened the small door, claimed he was too weak for the large one, and cut off the giants' heads as they came through. Then he ran to rejoin his family, with his sword. He shut the door with such a bang that the castle woke. They were astounded by the bodies. The princess said they must find the giant-slayer, because she was honor-bound to marry him. She had a house built, and put over its door that whoever told the story of his life could stay there for nothing.

Meanwhile, Niels and his family went on toward Rome, but they met a man who showed them the holes in his shoes, and told them the shoes had been new when he left Rome. Discouraged, they turned back. They came upon the house and decided to stay there. The steward questioned the father and the older son, and told the princess that nothing had happened to them, but admitted he had not asked them all. The princess went herself. The older brother put in that he had forgotten to tell that his brother had found a sword. Niels, who had guessed this was a way to discover him, wanted to escape, but they found the sword, and searched him, finding the handkerchief and slipper. Niels was afraid that they would punish him, but the princess said only they must wait until her father returned. When he did, the princess married Niels, who was king after the king died.

== Analysis ==
The tale is classified in the Aarne-Thompson-Uther Index as ATU 304, "The Skillful Hunter" or "The Dangerous Night-Watch".

According to scholar Kurt Ranke, tale type 304 occurs in Europe (Central, Northern and "especially" Eastern) and is "frequent" in Turkish tradition.

=== Combinations ===
Herbert Halpert and Widdowson stated that "a standard element" of this tale type was the decapitation of the robbers (or giants), a sequence of tale type AT 956, "Robbers' Heads cut off one by one as they enter house".

In some variants of ATU 304, before the hero enters the castle of the princesses and kills the giants, he meets a personified being (an old man or an old woman) that controls the day and night cycle, either with balls or yarns (a black one symbolizing the night, and a white one representing the day). The hero then ties this being up a tree so that it remains nighttime. He takes advantage of the cloak of darkness to lure the giants (robbers, in other variants) to the castle to kill them. This type of narrative is classified as another tale type: AaTh 723*, "Hero Binds Midnight, Dawn, and Midday".

This secondary sequence was identified by Herbert Halpert and J.D.A Widdowson as existing in "Hungary, Romania, Yugoslavia, Serbia, Bulgaria, Greece, Turkey, Georgia, Armenia [from Detroit immigrants], Bashkir, and Persia" and in two African variants. Professor Raluca Nicolae adds Albanian and East Bohemian tales where the motif appears.

In addition, Richard MacGillivray Dawkins described this sequence in regards to Greek variants of tale type ATU 552, "The Girls Who Married Animals": the hero stills finds a person who alternates day and night by manipulating balls of white and black yarn or skeins, whom he ties up a tree, and later finds a cadre of robbers or giants who intend to invade a nearby king's castle.

In turn, Hungarian-American scholar Linda Degh argued that the tale type 723* "was formed specifically in the Hungarian folk tradition".

== See also ==
- The Brown Bear of the Green Glen
- The King of England and his Three Sons
- The Water of Life
