= Ioan Slavici National College =

- Colegiul Național Ioan Slavici

Location
- Ioan Slavici Street, Nr. 4 Satu Mare, Satu Mare County; Romania
- Coordinates: 47.7973°N 22.8755°E

Information
- Funding type: Public
- Motto: "Fii schimbarea pe care vrei să o vezi în lume!"
- Established: 1812; 214 years ago
- Principal: Alina Dragoș, Ionela Manda
- Staff: approx. 54
- Grades: 5–12
- Age range: 10–18
- Enrollment: c. 733
- Classes: 27
- Average class size: 26
- Language: Romanian
- Mascot: Salvi
- Website: www.cnislavici.ro

Ioan Slavici National College (Romanian: Colegiul Național Ioan Slavici) is a public day high school for students aged 10 to 18, established in 1812, and located at 4 Ioan Slavici Street, Satu Mare, Romania. The school is named after the great Romanian writer and journalist Ioan Slavici. The Ioan Slavici National College is one of the four national colleges located in Satu Mare, alongside Mihai Eminescu, Kölcsey Ferenc, and Doamna Stanca.

== History ==
Operating in buildings that have sheltered educational institutions since 1812, the Ioan Slavici National College has a well-defined role in the town's higher education society. The three buildings of the college include 26 classrooms, 5 laboratories, 12 offices, a library with over 30,000 volumes, 2 gyms, a sports field with a running track, a volleyball court, handball and basketball courts, one festive room, and a 200-seat chapel, thus ensuring the proper conduct of the educational activities.

Different disciplines offer an optional curriculum that covers all the areas being proposed to expand the scope of knowledge in a given field, but also to awaken the students through an innovative approach. Many circles of creation and scientific circles give all the students the opportunity to follow their passions, the offer being very generous (dramatic circle, photo/video circle, chemistry circle, knowledge and truth circle – operating since 1977, obtaining four patents, friends of Biology circle, antiquities fans circle and the Adagio Choir, founded in 1993, member of the International Association of Amateur Chorus, with many successes and national and international partnerships, having recorded three audio tapes and two CDs.

Since the 2005–2006 school year, the college is an eco-school, being the first school in the county that has obtained the green flag. In this school year it was accredited for ECDL courses, providing students and conditions for staff members to obtain the European Computer Driving Licence.
