= The King of Erin and the Queen of the Lonesome Island =

Irish fairy tale

Folk tale
- Name: The King of Erin and the Queen of the Lonesome Island
- Country: Ireland
- Published in: Myths and Folk-lore of Ireland

"The King of Erin and the Queen of the Lonesome Island" is an Irish fairy tale collected by Jeremiah Curtin in Myths and Folk-lore of Ireland.

== Synopsis ==
A king went hunting. Near evening, he saw the first animal, a black pig, and so chased it. The pig swam out to sea, and the king followed it. His horse drowned, but he swam and saw an island. On it, he found a house with razors on the threshold and needles on the lintel, but he jumped between them and sat by the fire. A meal came, without his seeing anyone bring it, and he ate. At night, he sensed a woman in the room but could not touch her. He tried to leave the next two days, but the woman used magic to keep him from finding his way. On the third night, the woman appeared and said she had been the pig; she and her two sisters were captive there until their son should free them. In the morning, she gave him a boat to get back, and nine months later, she had a son.

When her son was grown, she wept one day, and explained that the king of Erin would die the next day, because the king of Spain had brought a great army against him. The son said he would help if he were there, and the mother sent him by magic. He asked the king of Spain for a day's truce and went to the king of Erin as a guest. The next day, he arrayed himself as a champion and drove the king of Spain's army from the field. The king of Erin had two sons, cowards who had hidden from the fight, but their mother told the king that the champion was the older of them. During the feasting, the queen gave the champion a drink that made him drowsy and then pushed him from the window into the sea, but he swam for four days and nights until he came to a rock where he lived for three months. A ship rescued him; the captain had tried to reach the Lonesome Island and failed because of fire. With the son, he succeeded, and the son told his mother what had happened with the queen.

The new king of Spain came to avenge his father's death, and the mother sent her son again; the queen made the same claim about her older son and put some chicken blood into her mouth, claiming it was her heart's blood and she needed water from Tubber Tintye to recover. The son went for it with her two sons. They met a woman washing her hair in a golden basin. She called the son her sister-son and told him it was too hard. They stayed the night, and the next morning the older of the queen's sons claimed to be ill and unable to go on. They went on to another aunt of the son's. At this house, she told him that the people of Tubber Tintye slept for seven years and woke for seven years, and learned from an eagle they had just gone to sleep. The younger of the queen's son claimed to be ill and unable to go on. The aunt gave her nephew a bridle and told him to shake it before the stables and take whatever horse came out. He took the dirty, lean, shaggy little horse that came. It called him the son of the king of Erin and the queen of the Lonesome Island, which was the first the son had heard of his father. The horse leapt over the river of fire, and the son jumped from its back into the window at the castle. He found many monsters and then a chamber with the most beautiful woman he had ever seen. He went on through twelve more chambers, each with a sleeping woman more beautiful than the last, until at last he came to the golden room, where the queen slept, with the well at her feet. He decided to stay there, and did for six days and nights. A table there had a loaf of bread and a leg of meat, and if every man in Erin had eaten from that table from a year, there would have been as much food on it at the end. He left a letter so that the queen might know that he was the one who had been there, and took the bread and the meat. He sprang from the window back onto the back of the horse.

The horse carried him away and had him chop it into four quarters and strike them with a rod; this turned them back into the four princes that they had been before. He freed his two aunts from their spell and went back with them and the queen's sons. The older of the queen's sons stole the water and gave it to his mother. The son went back with his aunts to the Lonesome Island.

After seven years, the queen of Tubber Tintye woke and found she had a six-year-old son. Her sage said only a hero could have made it there, and a hero would have left some sign. They found his letter, which pleased the queen. She brought her army to the castle of the king of Erin and demanded the man who had come to her castle while she slept. The king summoned the queen's two sons in turn, each of whom claimed to have done it, but she demanded that each one ride her horse, and it threw and killed them. The king sent a message to the Lonesome Island, and the queen there and her son came. He could ride the horse, and so she knew he was the man. She put a belt on the queen of Erin that magically tightened, and forced from her the knowledge that her older son was the gardener's, and the younger the brewer's. The queen of Tubber Tintye had the king of Erin burn her. The king of Erin married the queen of the Lonesome Island, and his son married the queen of Tubber Tintye.

== See also ==
- The Brown Bear of the Green Glen
- The King of England and his Three Sons
- The Water of Life
