= Kölcsey Ferenc National College =

- Colegiul Național Kölcsey Ferenc; Kölcsey Ferenc Főgimnázium
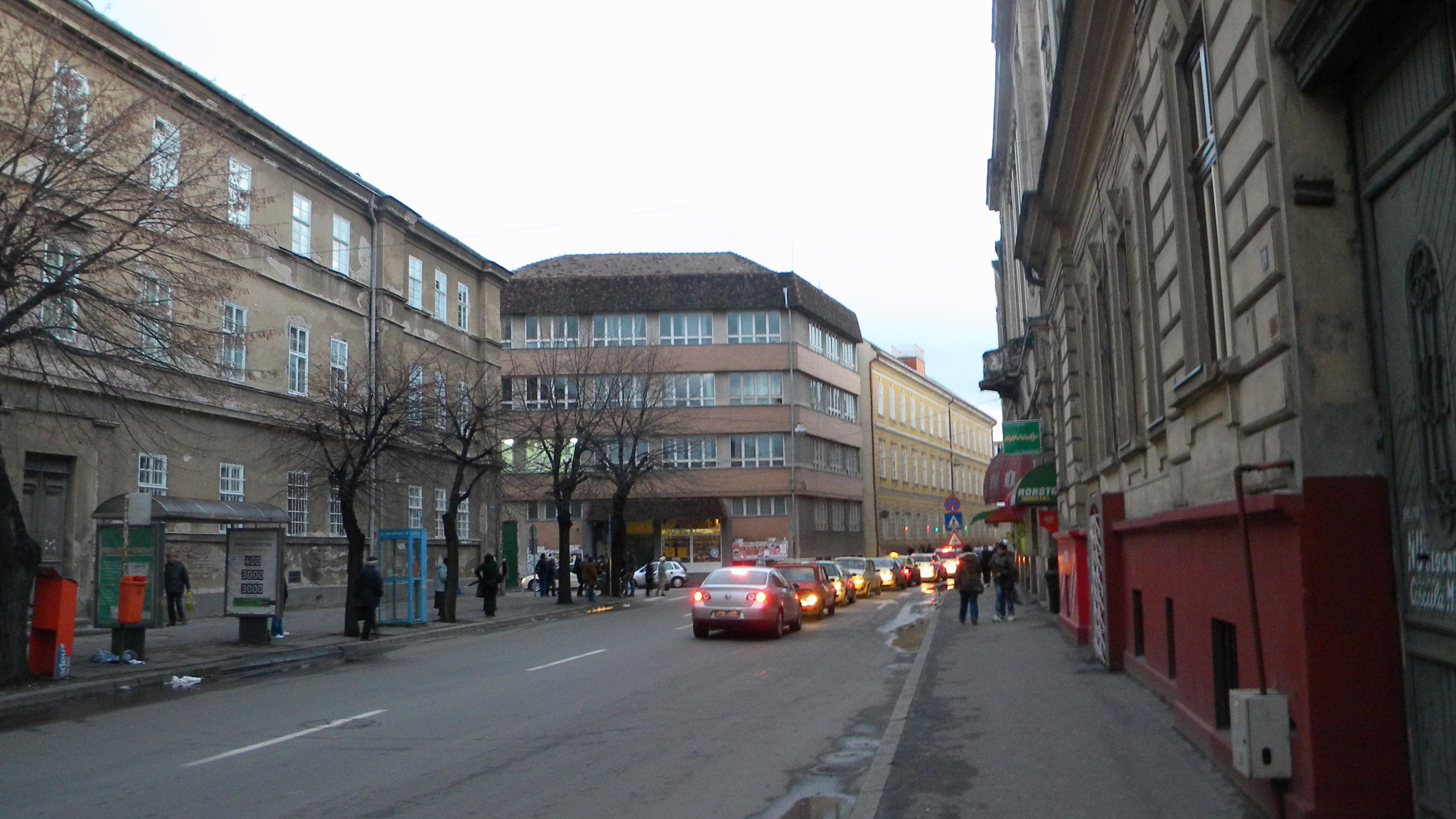
- front view of the college

Location
- George Coșbuc Street, Nr. 2 Satu Mare, Satu Mare County; Romania; 47°48′N 22°53′E

Information
- Funding type: Public
- Established: 1557; 469 years ago
- Principal: Enikő Pataki
- Staff: 73
- Grades: 0–12
- Age range: 6–18
- Enrollment: c. 800
- Classes: 28
- Average class size: 25
- Language: Hungarian
- Website: www.kolcsey.ro

Kölcsey Ferenc National College (Romanian: Colegiul Național Kölcsey Ferenc, Hungarian: Kölcsey Ferenc Főgimnázium) is a public day high school for students aged 10 to 18, established in 1557 as a reformed school, and located at 2 George Coșbuc Street, Satu Mare, Romania. The school is named after the great Hungarian poet, literary critic, orator, and politician Ferenc Kölcsey. The Kölcsey Ferenc National College is one of the only four national colleges located in Satu Mare alongside Mihai Eminescu, Ioan Slavici, and Doamna Stanca.

== History ==
The school was founded, in the second half of the 16th century (around 1557), initially as a lower school (current language school in general) as a subsidiary of the University of Debrecen. Even if it was occasionally degraded, it always operated, as a general school (lower secondary school), or as a high school, ending with the baccalaureate. The community always took care of the school, because of the interests served.

The school has 24 high school classes and 4 secondary school classes. There are 2 physics laboratories, 4 science laboratories, offices of the Romanian and Hungarian languages, biology, chemistry, history, and geography laboratories and a sports hall that is well endowed with volleyball, handball, basketball and football courts. The college has three main specialisations: mathematics and science, natural science, social science and philology in both normal and foreign language classes.

The college is accredited for ECDL courses, providing students and conditions for staff members to obtain the European Computer Driving Licence.

== Teachers ==
- Sándor Gellért
- Angella Sorbán

== Alumni ==
- Artur Dancs
- Rodion Markovits
- Attila Varga
