= Ioan Slavici =

Romanian writer and journalist (1848 - 1925)

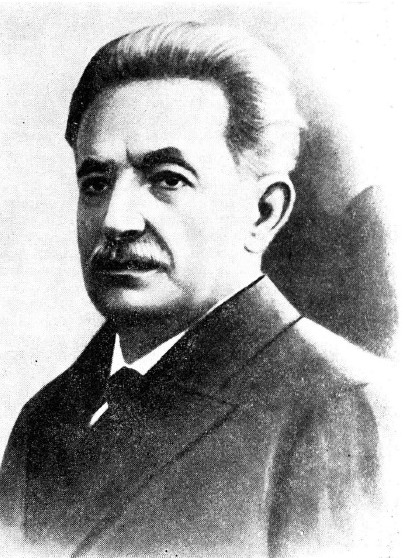
- Born: 18 January 1848; Világos, Austrian Empire (today Șiria, Arad County, Romania)
- Died: 17 August 1925 (aged 77); Panciu, Putna County, Kingdom of Romania
- Resting place: Brazi Monastery, Panciu, Romania
- Citizenship: Kingdom of Hungary; Hungarian State; Austria-Hungary; Kingdom of Romania
- Education: Law School of Pest; University of Vienna
- Occupations: Writer, journalist
- Spouses: Katalin Szőke Magyarósy (m. 1875; div. 1885) Eleonora Tănăsescu (m. 1886)
- Children: Titu Liviu; Lavinia; Ioana; Josefina; Marcel; Livia
- Writing career
- Language: Romanian
- Genres: Novel, novella, play, fairy tale
- Notable works: Zâna Zorilor (1872); Moara cu noroc (1880); Budulea Taichii (1880); Pădureanca (1884); Mara (1894)
- Literary movement: Naturalism

Ioan Slavici (Romanian pronunciation: [iˈo̯an ˈslavitʃʲ]; 18 January 1848 – 17 August 1925) was a Romanian writer and journalist from Austria-Hungary, later Romania.

He made his debut in Convorbiri literare ("Literary Conversations") (1871), with the comedy Fata de birău ("The Mayor's Daughter"). Alongside Mihai Eminescu he founded the Young Romania Social and Literary Academic Society and organized, in 1871, the Putna Celebration of the Romanian Students from Romania and from abroad. At the end of 1874, he settled in Bucharest, where he became secretary of the Hurmuzachi Collection Committee, then he became a professor, and then an editor of the newspaper Timpul ("The Time"). Alongside Ion Luca Caragiale and George Coșbuc, he edited the Vatra ("The Hearth") magazine. During World War I, he collaborated at the newspapers Ziua ("The Day") and Gazeta Bucureștilor ("The Bucharest Gazette"). He was awarded the Romanian Academy Award (1903).

== Early life ==
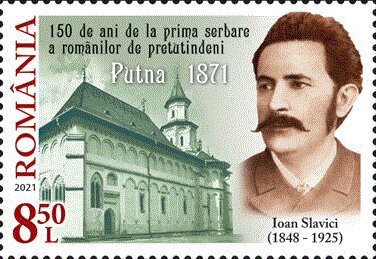
Ioan Slavici on a 2021 stamp

Slavici was born in the village of Világos (today Șiria, Romania), near Arad, in 1848 to Sava and Elena Slavici. Slavici studied at the local Orthodox school in Șiria and various other institutions in Transylvania, taught in either Hungarian or German and becomes a member of the Romania Lecture Society.

After finishing his studies, Slavici first enrolles to study law in Budapest in 1868, and in Vienna, in 1869. But shortly after due to financial difficulties he is forced to return to Cumlaus and take a job as a notary public. Throughout his employment, Slavici saved the money that would help him continue his studies in Vienna.

== Junimea ==
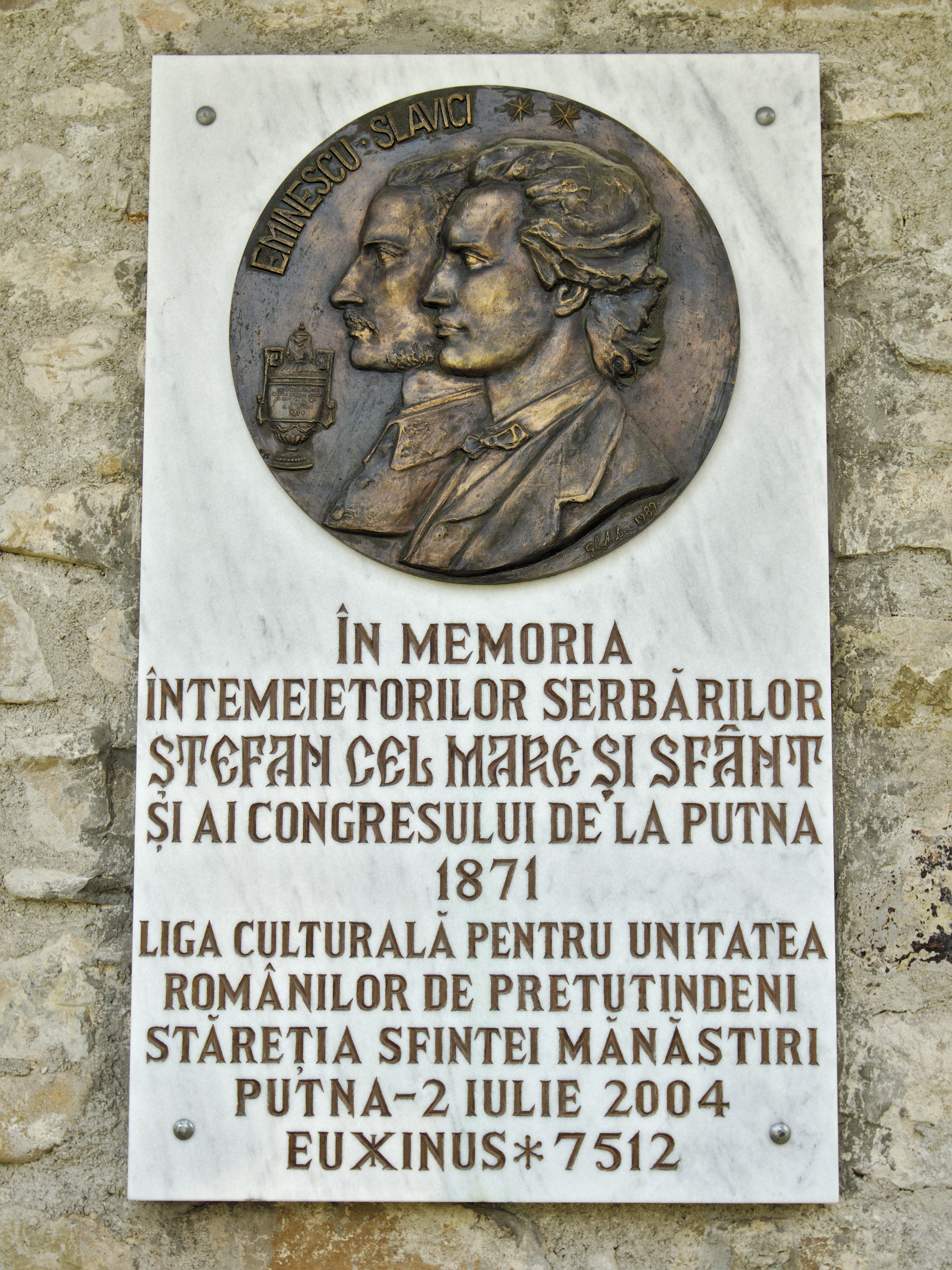
Eminescu and Slavici on a plaque at Putna Monastery

In 1871, he left for Vienna as part of his military service. This proved to be a decisive moment in the life of the future writer, as Slavici had a chance to meet Mihai Eminescu, the most important Romanian poet, who was studying at the University of Vienna. The two became good friends, with Eminescu encouraging and assisting Slavici in the development of his style and of the works themselves. The same year marked Slavici's literary debut in Convorbiri Literare, the mouthpiece of the Junimea society in Iași.

In 1872, Slavici again had to interrupt his studies because of financial difficulties. Two years later, he left Austria-Hungary and moved to Iași, where he took part in the Junimea gatherings. In 1874 the Ioan Slavici Classical Theatre was established in Arad. His first book, Nuvele din popor, a collection of short stories, was published in 1881. It included Moara cu noroc (The Lucky Mill) and Budulea Taichii, two of Slavici's best-known and crafted works.

== Prisons and return to Romania ==
In 1882, he was selected as a corresponding member of the Romanian Academy. In 1884, Slavici moved to Transylvania, becoming actively involved in the Romanian national movement, serving as a member of the Central Committee of the Romanian National Party, the main political forum of Romanians in the region. Hungarian authorities sentenced Slavici to one year in prison for his nationalist stance. This was the first of many short stays in prison in Slavici's life (not all of them connected with his political attitudes – some were the outcome of lawsuits against other journalists).

Six years later, he moved to Bucharest and, in 1894, he began publishing the first parts of his most famous novel, Mara, which was published as a single volume 12 years later. This is also the period of his activities as editor of Vatra magazine, alongside George Coșbuc and Ion Luca Caragiale.

== World War I and later years ==
In 1909, Slavici began work for the pro-German newspaper Ziua. With the outbreak of World War I, his writings at the newspaper brought him into conflict with other intellectuals who supported the Triple Entente powers. On 14 August 1916, Romania entered the War on the Entente side, attacking Hungary in Transylvania. After a successful German and Austro-Hungarian counterattack, Romania had most of its territory (including Bucharest) occupied by the German, Austro-Hungarian, and Bulgarian troops in the summer of 1917.

The Romanian legitimate government took refuge in Iași, with the Central Powers establishing a puppet administration for the occupied lands. Slavici collaborated with the new government, being employed as editor of the official journal, the Bucharest Gazette. After the German withdrawal in November 1918, he was put on trial for his wartime activities and spent one year in jail, while his reputation with the intelligentsia was tarnished.

In 1925 Slavici went to stay with his daughter in Panciu (a town now in Vrancea County). He died there later that year, and was buried at the hermitage within Brazi Monastery.

== Antisemitism ==
In contrast to the Junimea leadership, Slavici was an outspoken antisemite. His early definition of Jews as "a disease" was doubled by his arguments in favor of their violent expulsion from Romanian soil:

"The solution that remains for us is, at a signal, to close the borders, to annihilate them, to throw them into the Danube right up to the very last of them, so that nothing remain of their seed!"

Later on, Slavici considered that:

"The hatred that has welled up against these people is natural, and this hatred can easily be unleashed against all of them that have inherited wealth or acquired it themselves, and could lead at the end to a horrible shedding of blood."

== Legacy ==
The Ioan Slavici Classical Theatre in Arad and the Ioan Slavici National College in Satu Mare are named in his honor. Streets in Arad, Baia Mare, Bistrița, Satu Mare, Suceava, and Timișoara also bear his name.

== Works ==
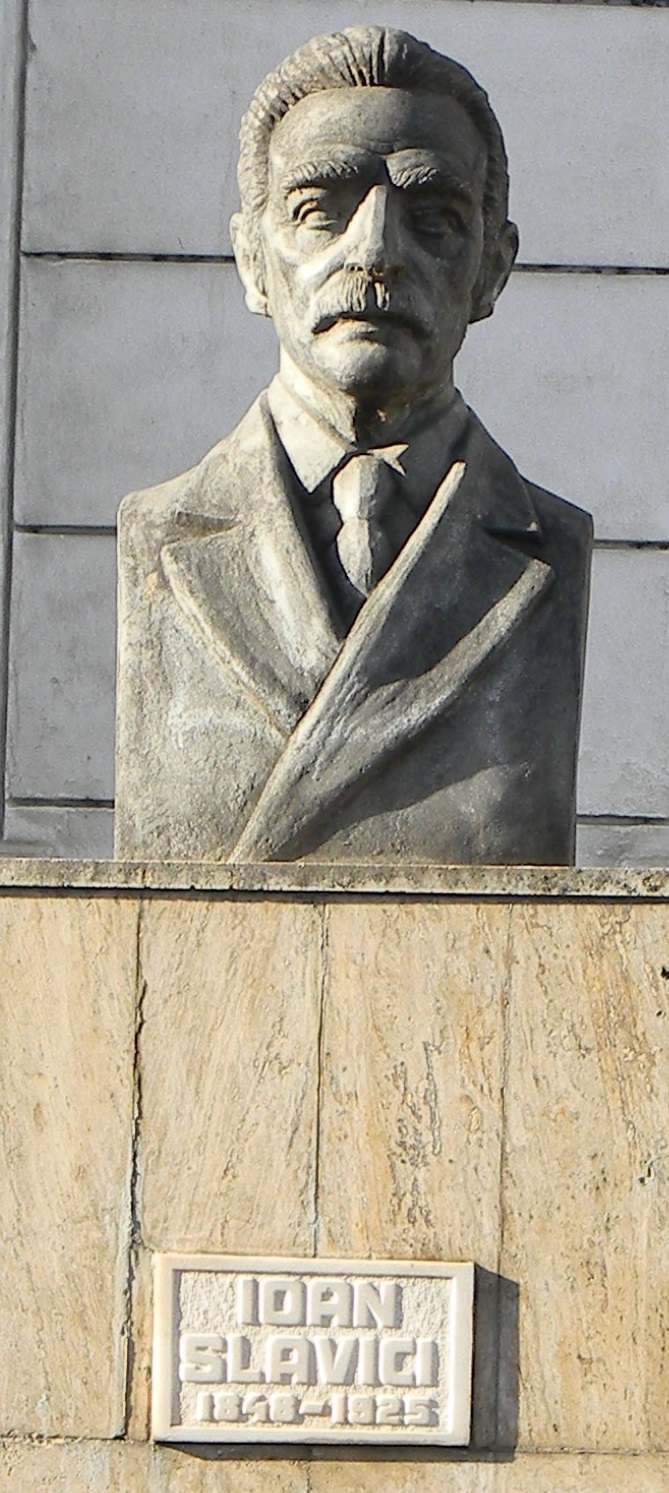
Bust of Slavici in Arad

=== Theatre ===
Comedy

- Fata de birău (1871)
- Toane sau Vorbe de clacă (1875)
- Polipul unchiului (1875)

Drama

- Bogdan Vodă (1876)
- Gaspar Graziani (1888)

=== Fairy tales ===
- "Zâna Zorilor", in English "The fairy Aurora"
- "Florița din codru"
- "Doi feți cu stea în frunte", in English "The twins with the golden star"
- "Păcală în satul lui"
- "Spaima zmeilor"
- "Rodul tainic"
- "Ileana cea șireată"
- "Ioanea mamei"
- "Petrea prostul"
- "Limir-împărat"
- "Băiet sărac"
- "Împăratul șerpilor"
- "Doi frați buni"
- "Băiat sărac și horopsit"
- "Nărodul curții"
- "Negru împărat"
- "Peștele pe brazdă"
- "Stan Bolovan"
- "Boierul și Păcală"

=== Novellas ===
- Popa Tanda (1873)
- Scormon (1875)
- La crucea din sat (1876)
- Crucile roșii (1876)
- O viață pierdută (1876)
- Gura satului (1878)
- Budulea Taichii (1880)
- Moara cu noroc (The Mill of Good Luck, 1880)
- Pădureanca (1884)
- Comoara (1896)
- Vatra părăsită (1900)
- La răscruci (1906)
- Pascal, săracul (1920)

=== Novels ===
- Mara (1894)
- Din bătrâni (1902)
- Din bătrâni. Manea (1905):)
- Corbei (1906)
- Din două lumi (1920)
- Cel din urmă armaș (1923)
- Din păcat în păcat (1924)

=== Memoires ===
- Fapta omenească. Scrisori adresate unui tânăr (1888–1889)
- Serbarea de la Putna (1903)
- Închisorile mele (1920)
- Amintiri (1924)
- Lumea prin care am trecut (1924)
