= The Fairy Aurora =

Romanian fairy tale by Ioan Slavici

- Short story by Ioan Slavici
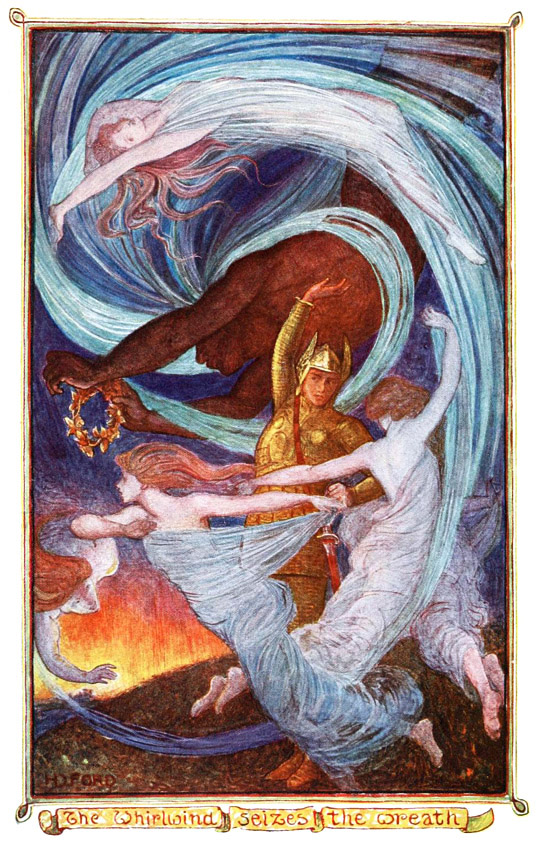
- Original title: Zâna Zorilor
- Country: United Principalities of Moldavia and Wallachia
- Language: Romanian
- Genre(s): fairy tale

Publication
- Published in: Convorbiri Literare
- Publication type: Art magazine
- Publication date: June 1872

"The Fairy Aurora" (in Romanian: Zâna Zorilor, lit. 'Fairy of Dawn') is a fairy tale written by Ioan Slavici and published in June 1872. Mihai Eminescu urged him to write his first story, which was read at Junimea in two sessions and was published in the magazine Convorbiri Literare.

It appeared in English as "The Fairy Aurora" in the Roumanian Fairy Tales with 18 Romanian stories published in 1885 by Henry Holt and Company in New York City.

== Summary ==
The ruler of a vast empire has one eye that laughs and one eye that cries, and the reason is only known to him. His three sons, Florea, Costan, and Petru each ask him about it on different occasions. Only the youngest, Petru, obtains the answer: the emperor cries because he thinks that after he dies his son will not be able to protect their realm from enemies and that only the water from the fountain of the Fairy of the Dawn will be able to make both his eyes laugh again.

Florea and Costan depart on the quest first, but after escaping a vicious dragon on the bridge, never return home. Petru tries his luck but is less successful than his brothers. His old nurse, back at the palace, advises him to take the emperor's trusty old horse to cross the bridge. The horse is magical and can reach different speeds. With this fabulous steed, Prince Petru kills the dragon, crosses the bridge, and arrives in a desert.

His father's horse asks what speeds they should traverse: like the wind, the drought the desire, or a curse? Petru agrees they should apply different speeds so as to not tire out and to cross the desert as fast as possible. And so they do.

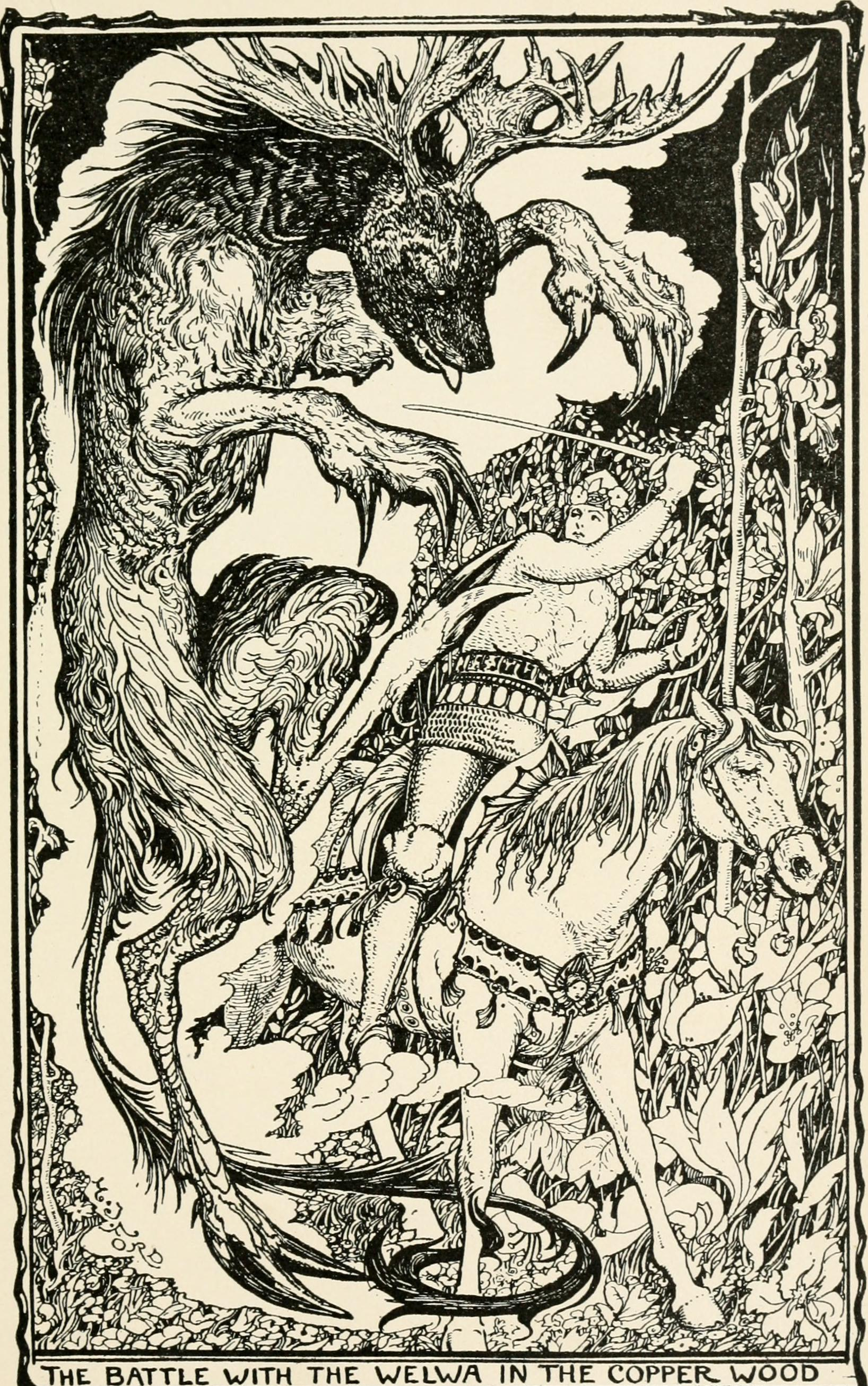
Petru fights the chimeric Welva in the wood. Illustration by H. Justice Ford (Violet Fairy Book).

After crossing the desert, Petru and the horse reach a copper forest and traverse it. The flowers cry out to him to pick one of them, but the horse dissuades him because they are cursed and will summon the Welwa, a chimeric monster of the wood. Petru decides to face the Welwa and picks up a flower. The monster appears to face the prince, and they engage in combat for days. Being locked in fierce combat, both pant, and gasp for breath, but Petru's horse encourages him to keep fighting. On the third day of battle, Petru throws the horse's bridle on the Welwa and the creature turns into a horse. The animal thanks Petru for releasing him from a curse, and rubs his nose against Petru's mount (the horse's brother).

Petru and the horses cross through a wood made entirely of silver, the flowers begging to be gathered, but Petru is warned by the first Welwa that gathering the flowers will draw the attention of a second Welwa, even stronger than the first. Despite the danger, Petru plucks the flowers and prepares to face the second Welwa. After three days, and a tiring battle, Petru casts a horse's bridle over the second Welwa, returning to normal.

Lastly, the group passes by a third wood made entirely of gold, and the same warning applies: if any of the flowers are gathered, it will draw yet another Welwa to them.

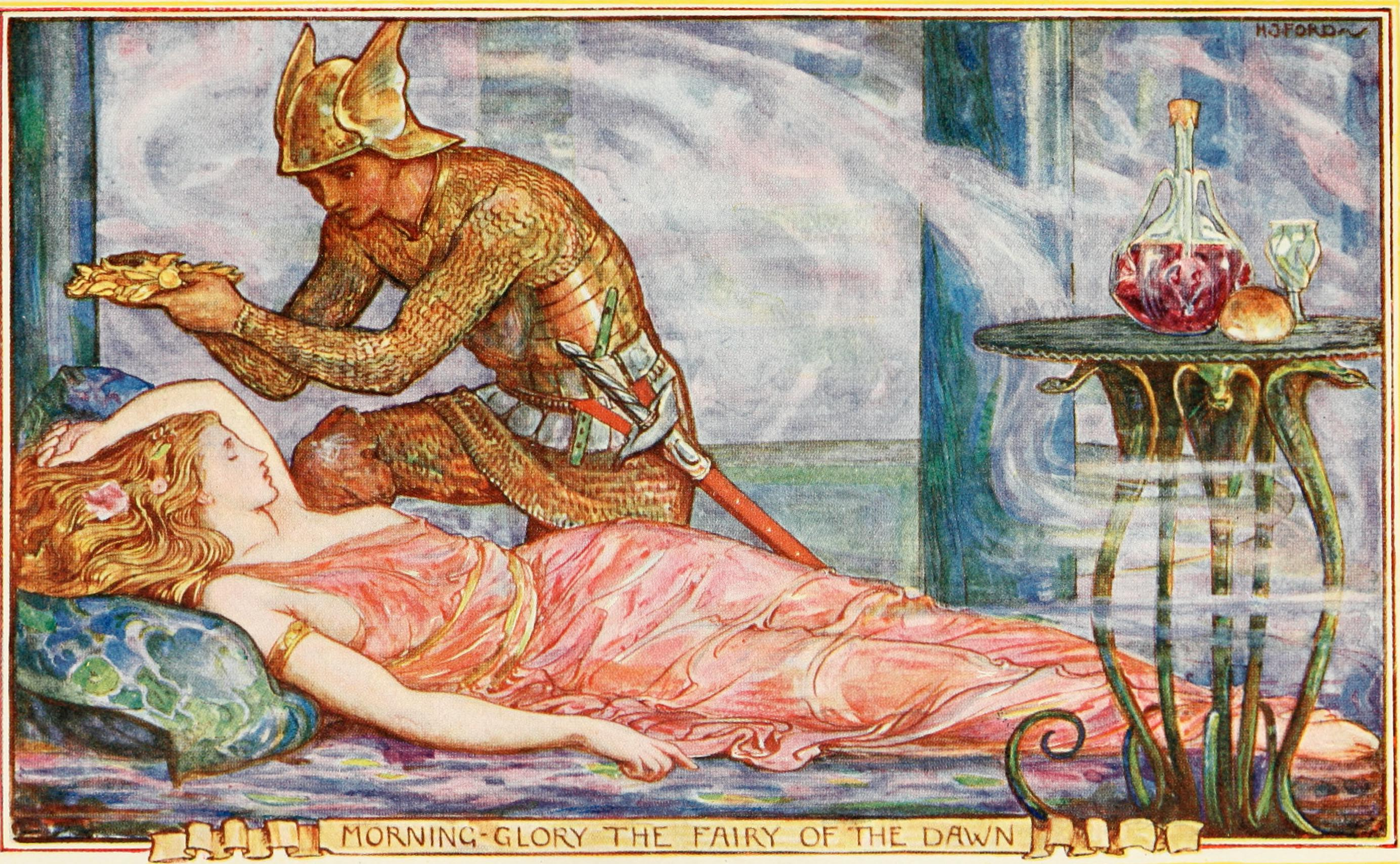
The Fairy of Dawn and the Prince

== Translations ==
Andrew Lang also translated this Romanian tale with the title The Fairy of the Dawn, published in The Violet Fairy Book. The king has one weeping eye and one laughing eye, and asks for the water from the fountain of the Fairy of the Dawn for both eyes to laugh again.

The tale was translated into German by Mite Kremnitz and Petre Ispirescu as Die Fee der Morgenröthe, in 1882.

A later translation titled the tale The Dawn Fairy.

== Analysis ==
=== Tale type ===
The tale is classified in the international Aarne-Thompson-Uther Index as tale type ATU 551, "The Water of Life" ("Sons on a Quest for a Wonderful Remedy for Their Father").

Despite its origins as a literary tale, author Ioan Slavici claimed that he heard some oral versions across Romania: Smoefa cea frumoasă; in Zărand, Zîna codrilor; in Comloșu (Crișana), Pĕtru Fĕt-frumos viteaz; and in Timișoara, Zîna zorilor. He stated that, barring a few differences between versions, they all contained the same plot points: the Emperor's eyes, Petru's journey, the help from the holy sisters, the miraculous fountain, and the brothers' deception.

=== Motifs ===
According to scholar Adela Ileana Drăucean, the dragons guard the bridge between the kingdom, representing the obstacle the hero, Făt-Frumos, must cross to advance on his quest. The tale also presents, as perilous adversaries to the hero, three Vâlva Pădurii, "dark spirit[s] of the forest" with magical powers: "the beldam from the copper forest (Vâlva Pădurii de aramă), the beldam from the silver forest (Vâlva Pădurii de argint) and the beldam from the golden forest (Vâlva Pădurii de aur)."

Scholar Simona Galațchi interprets the "Fairy of Dawn" as a character associated with the dawn, sunlight, youth and rejuvenation, specially due to three magical items she owns: a fountain of life-giving water, a ring of power and "the wine of youth".

== See also ==
- Laughing Eye and Weeping Eye
- Leaves of Pearls
- The Water of Life (German fairy tale)
