= Darshai =

Village in Tajikistan

- Village
- Location within Tajikistan Location within Asia
- Coordinates: 36.79863°N 72.00135°E
- Country: Tajikistan
- Region: Gorno-Badakhshan
- District: Ishkoshim
- Time zone: UTC+05:00 (Tajikistan Time)
  - Summer (DST): (Not Observed)

Darshai, also known as Darshay, is a village in Tajikistan. It falls in Ishkoshim District of Gorno-Badakhshan Autonomous Oblast.

== Terrain ==
Darshai lies in the Wakhan Valley which was an important branch on the Silk Road. The valley is part of Pamir mountain range. The area is rich in minerals.

== Architecture ==
The houses here have typical Pamiri interior with a skylight at the centre of the ceiling in an artistic arrangement of four wooden squares thought to be representing Zoroastrian elements of air, water, earth and fire.

== See also ==
- Ishkoshim District
- Gorno-Badakhshan Autonomous Oblast
