= The Rider Of Grianaig, And Iain The Soldier's Son =

Scottish fairy tale

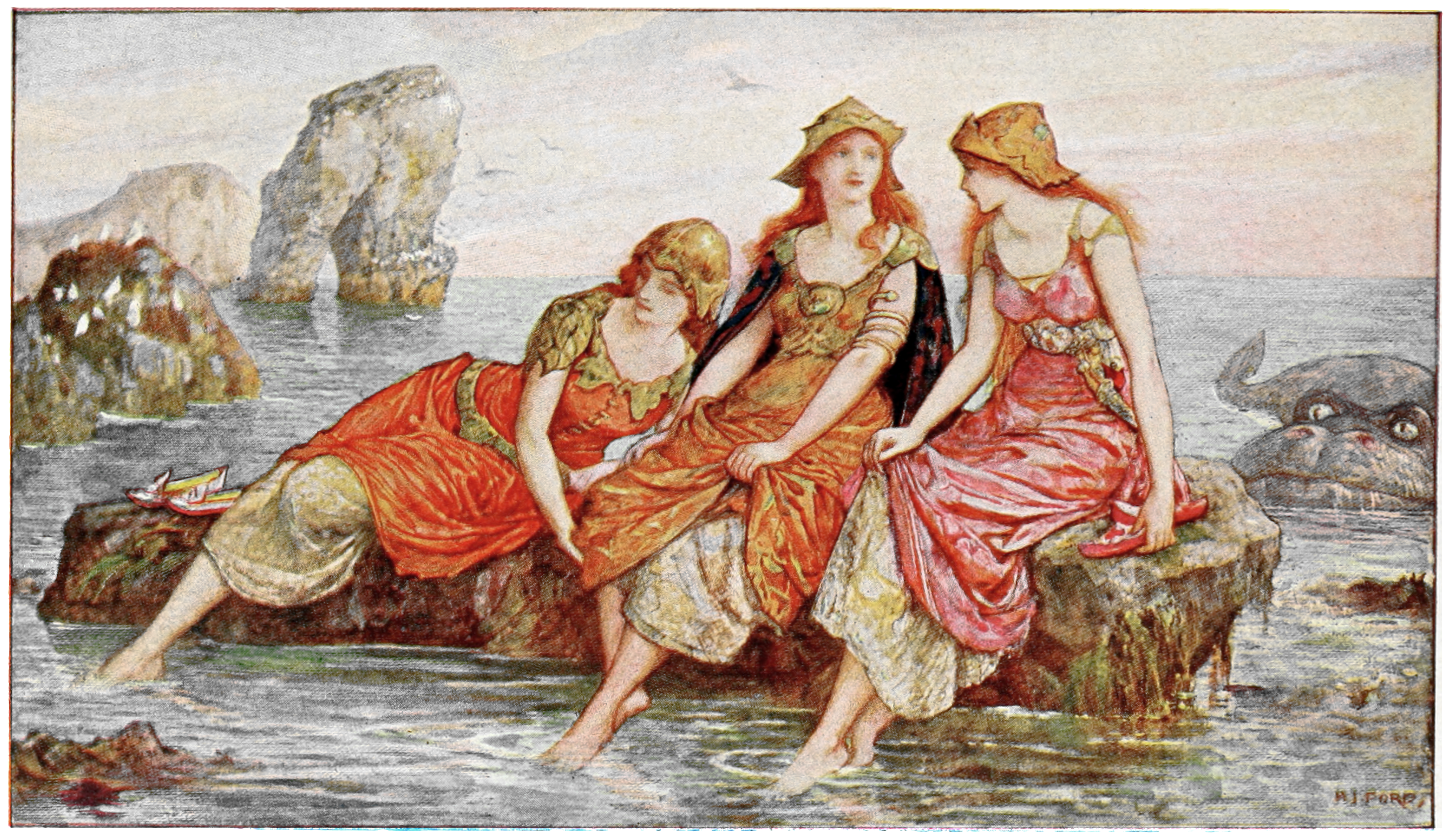

"The Rider Of Grianaig, And Iain The Soldier's Son" is a Scottish fairy tale collected by John Francis Campbell in Popular Tales of the West Highlands (1860–1862), listing his informant as Donald MacNiven, a lame carrier, in Bowmore, Islay; the story was written down by Hector MacLean on 5 July 1859. Andrew Lang included it in The Orange Fairy Book (1906) as "Ian, the Soldier's Son".

== Synopsis ==
The knight of Grianaig had three daughters, but a mysterious beast carried them off. A soldier's three sons were going to play a game at Christmas, and the youngest son, Iain, insisted that they do it on the knight's lawn, because it was the smoothest, but this, as his brothers had warned, offended the knight because it reminded him of his daughters. Iain said he should give them a ship, and they would find his daughters. The knight agreed.

The brothers set out. They found a place where men were preparing for the wedding of the three daughters to three giants. There was a creel, which could lift them to where the daughters were. Each brother tried in turn; the older two were belabored by a raven and turned back; Iain, facing the same raven, called them to hoist him the more quickly. At the top, the raven asked him for tobacco, and when Iain refused him, told him to go to a giant's house, where he would find the oldest daughter. He went. The oldest daughter told him that rattling a chain would bring the giant, but only Iain the soldier's son could fight him. Iain rattled the chain and wrestled with the giant; he wished the raven were with him, and it helped him win the fight and gave him a knife to cut off its head.

The raven then told him to not let the daughter put him off, but to go on. Then it asked him for tobacco, and Iain offered him half; the raven told him that he had much to do yet, and should not offer that much. It then sent him to anoint himself and bathe before he slept, so he would be whole on the morning. He did this, and went on to rescue the second, and the youngest daughter. Then he took the three daughters and the giants' gold and silver and went back. The raven warned him to go first and have the daughters lowered after, but he lowered the daughters first, keeping only the youngest's cap, and the creel did not come back for him.

The raven told him to spend the night at the giant's house. In the morning, it took him to the stables where the door was opening and shutting; there was a steed for him in it, if he got through the door. Iain asked the raven to go first; it did, and lost only a feather. Iain tried and was killed. The raven revived him and told him to walk and not wonder at anything he saw, or touch anything. He came to three dead men, and pulled out the spears; the men sat up, and made him come to the cave of the black fisherman. There a hag turned them to stone; Iain defeated her, but was sent to fetch living water, to bring back the men. The raven sent him with the steed, which went over land and sea. There, as the raven told him, he put the horse in the stable himself and drank nothing but whey and water; but though the horse warned him against sleeping, he was enchanted by music and slept. The horse broke in and woke him. They barely escaped. With the water he revived the men.

The raven told him to leave the cap with him and sent him off on the steed to interrupt the wedding, because his brothers were to marry the two older, and the foreman of the men preparing for the wedding, the youngest. He rode off, and when he arrived, the horse asked him to cut off its head. He refused. The horse explained that she was a young maiden, and the raven a young man who had courted her, but the giants changed them. He cut off her head.

At the castle, he heard that the youngest princess demanded a cap such as her sisters had. Iain wished for the raven, who brought him the cap, and Iain cut off his head, turning him into a young man. They went to the dead horse, where there was a young woman, and they went off together. Iain gave the cap to the smith. The youngest princess demanded where he had gotten it, and the smith told her. The youngest princess married Iain, and the false bridegrooms were driven off.

== See also ==
- Prâslea the Brave and the Golden Apples
- Soria Moria Castle
- The King of England and his Three Sons
- The King Of Lochlin's Three Daughters
- The Story of Bensurdatu
- The Three Princesses of Whiteland
- The Water of Life
