= The Water of Life (German fairy tale) =

German fairy tale

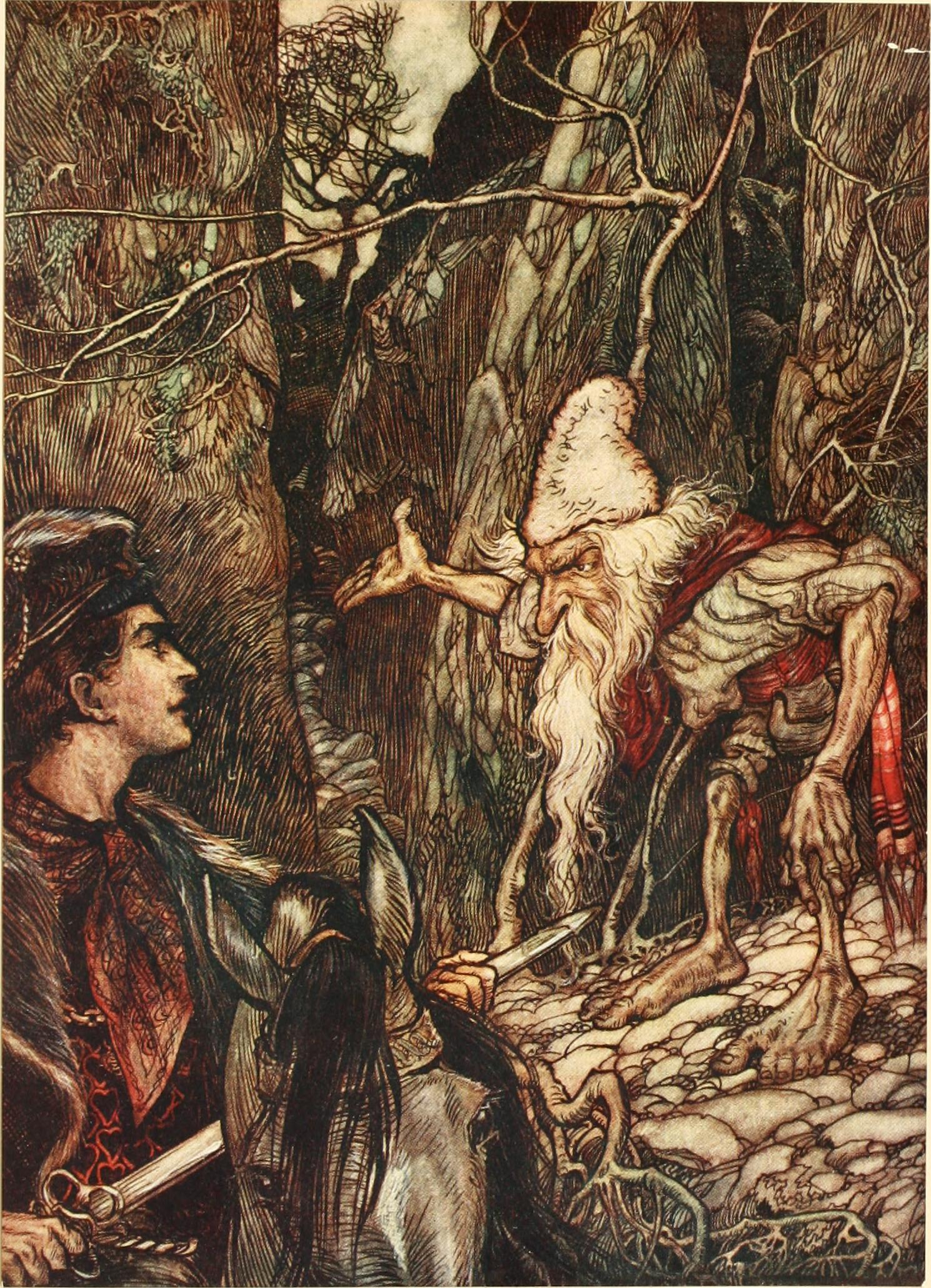
- Arthur Rackham, 1916

Folk tale
- Name: The Water of Life
- Aarne–Thompson grouping: ATU 551
- Country: Germany
- Published in: Grimms' Fairy Tales
- Related: The Brown Bear of the Green Glen; The King of England and his Three Sons

"The Water of Life" (German: Das Wasser des Lebens) is a German fairy tale collected by the Brothers Grimm, tale number 97.

It is Aarne-Thompson type 551.

John Francis Campbell noted it as a parallel of the Scottish fairy tale, The Brown Bear of the Green Glen.

== Synopsis ==
A king was dying. An old man told his sons that the water of life would save him. Each one set out in turn. The two older ones, setting out in hopes of being the heir, were rude to a dwarf on the way and became trapped in ravines. When the youngest son went, the dwarf asked where he was going, and he told him. The dwarf told him that what he sought was in a castle, and gave him an iron wand to open the gates and two loaves to feed to the lions inside. Then he had to get the water before the clock struck 12 when the gates would shut again.

He opened the gate with the wand and fed the lions the bread. Then he came to a hall where there were sleeping princes, and he took rings from their fingers and some bread and a sword from the table. He went on and found a beautiful princess, who kissed him, told him he had freed her, and promised to marry him if he returned within a year. Then she told him where the spring of the water of life was. He went on, but saw a bed and lay down to rest. He fell asleep and woke at a quarter to twelve. He sprang up, got the water, and escaped, with the closing gate taking off the heel of his boot.

He met the dwarf who told him what happened to his brothers and at his imploring freed them, warning the youngest son that his brothers had evil hearts. They came to a kingdom plagued by war and famine, the prince killed their foes with the sword and fed them with the loaf. Then they came to two more kingdoms in the same situation, and they did the same. Then they got on a ship to cross the sea and come home. The older brothers stole the water of life and filled his bottle with sea water.

The king was sickened by the sea water. The older brothers accused the youngest of trying to poison him and gave him the water of life. The king decided to have his youngest son secretly killed (as punishment). He sent a huntsman with him into the woods, but the huntsman was unable to bring himself to kill him and confessed the deed to the prince. The prince and the huntsman swapped clothes and the prince fled.

Treasure arrived, from the three kingdoms the youngest prince had saved, and the king wondered about his guilt and regretted having his son killed. The huntsman confessed that he had not killed him, and so the king issued a proclamation that he could freely return.

The princess in the castle had made a golden road to it and told her people that it would bring her true groom to her and to admit no one who did not ride straight up it. The two older princes (who were pretending to be the ones who freed her) saw it and thought it would be a shame to get it dirty, so they rode alongside, and the servants did not admit them. The youngest thought so constantly of the princess that he did not notice it, so he rode up it, was admitted, and they married. The prince went back to his father and told the true story. The king wished to punish the older brothers, but they had already boarded a ship and were never seen again.

== Analysis ==
=== Tale type ===
The tale is classified in the international Aarne-Thompson-Uther Index as type ATU 551, "The Water of Life" or "Sons on a Quest for a Wonderful Remedy for Their Father". Folklorist Stith Thompson noted the great similarities between this tale type and type ATU 550, "Quest for the Golden Bird" or "Bird, Horse and Princess".

== Variants ==
=== Literary history ===
German scholar Ernst Tegethoff translated a medieval French romance he titled Die Quelle der Jugend ("The Fountain of Youth"): a king is sick, and the doctors claim only the water from the fountain of life can cure him. He sends his three sons to find and bring him the water, but they have first to pass through four obstacles, the last of which a castle where a maiden resides and holds the very keys to the fountain. The youngest prince is advised by an old hermit on how to defeat the perils and reach the castle. Once there, he begs the maiden for the water, which she obliges and declares to be his wife.

=== Europe ===
Swedish folktale collectors George Stephens and Gunnar Olof Hyltén-Cavallius listed "The Water of Life" as a German variant close to the Swedish tale they collected, Ungdoms-Landet (English: 'The Land of Youth'). They also mentioned a Russian variant titled Das Märchen von Ljubin Czarewitsch, der schönen Czarewna, seiner Gemahlinn, und dem beflügelten Wolf, which was translated years later as Story of Lyubim Tsarevich and the Winged Wolf and Prince Lubim and the Winged Wolf.

In several variants, the object that can cure the king is either the water of youth, the waters of life and death, or a magical bird. In others, the king can be healed by seeking both items, such as in the Hungarian variant Der Fink mit der goldenen Stimme ('The finch with the golden voice'). At the end of the tale, the fairy maiden or foreign princess travels with her army or navy to the prince's kingdom in order to find the man who stole her wonderful bird or magical water.

In Estonian sources, the tale type is known as Imelik peegel ('The Wonderful Mirror') or Noorendav peegel ('The Mirror That Makes One Younger'), after a homonymous story by author Juhan Kunder.

At least two Armenian variants combine the tale type ATU 551, "The Water of Life (The Wonderful Remedy for the King)" with ATU 531, "The Clever Horse". In Kush-Pari or The Bird-Peri, three princes search for a cure for their father's blindness, but only the youngest is successful in journeying beyond the realm with his father's magical horse. The prince finds a brilliant golden feather on the way to another kingdom and delivers it to a second king, who wants the bird: the titular Kush-Pari. The prince fetches the Kush-Pari, her handmaiden and forty fiery mares for a ritual. The prince and the king take part in the ritual, but the king dies and the prince marries the Kush-Pari, now in human form. As the tale concludes, the Kush-Pari gives her husband the remedy to save his father. In The Fiery Horse, the three princes must seek, as remedy for their father, a lump of earth from "no human has even trodden". To help them in their quest, they need their father's Fiery Horse, found in the depths of a forest, but only the youngest prince finds and rides it. They ride into the Dark City and find a Luminous Feather. They appear before the king of this city, who wishes to own the bird of the luminous plumage. The second task is to bring the king the maiden who owns 40 cows swift as the wind and their milk as the third task. The prince and the king go through a ritual with the boiling milk, but only the prince goes unscathed and marries the maiden. Some time later, she reveals her husband the location of the fabled lump of earth: at the bottom of a lake, guarded by "ferocious Watery Horses tall as Mares".

=== Asia ===
==== India ====
In an Indian variant, The Rose of Bakawali (Hindi-Urdu: Gul-e-Bakawali), the king becomes blind and, on his doctors's orders, sends his five sons for the only possible cure: the magical rose (gulbakavali) of the fairy princess Bakawali. W. A. Clouston saw the quest for the magical flower as a parallel to the German fairy tale "The Water of Life".

== In popular culture ==
- The Water of Life was featured in Grimm's Fairy Tale Classics as part of its "Grimm Masterpiece Theater" season. One of the brothers is eliminated from the story, and the two remaining princes are named Joseph (the protagonist) and Franz (his treacherous eldest brother). Joseph's love interest is named Princess Anna. Additionally, the dwarf summons animals and the North Wind to ask them if they know where the Water can be found. The North Wind reveals its location to Joseph while the dwarf had previously banished Franz to the Valley of No Return due to his rudeness. The wand is replaced by the magic of the moonlight which Joseph uses to break the lock of the room containing Princess Anne, who is under attack by a demon who is destroyed by the moonlight. While Joseph collects the water, Anne flees the evil castle though picks up Joseph's broken sword which reveals to her the name of Joseph's kingdom. Joseph promises to court her once his father is well. While returning home, Joseph finds his injured brother Franz and heals him with the water. Despite being saved and healed by his brother, Franz conspires to switch the water with water from a nearby swamp as opposed to seawater. Instead of ordering Joseph's execution at first the king banishes him from the castle after being tricked by Franz, though he later orders the huntsman to kill Joseph after Franz convinces the King that Joseph will try to poison him again. Additionally, Joseph accepts his fate and asks his friend the huntsman who is also a knight to kill him as it is his duty as a knight to follow the king's orders. The huntsman instead convinces Joseph to flee the kingdom after refusing to kill him knowing that Joseph is innocent. He then delivers Joseph's clothes as 'evidence' that the deed is done, and then quits the king's service, stating that he can no longer serve the king after what he has done. Finally, it is Princess Anne who reveals Franz' treachery to his father when she appears at Franz' coronation to offer her hand in marriage believing it to be Joseph's coronation. Franz is apprehended by the palace guards when he attempts to flee as the heartbroken King explains to Anne that he had ordered Joseph's death, causing her to faint from a broken heart. While on the way home, Anna asks for some water as she continues to mourn the loss of Joseph and her carriage happens to stop at a nearby windmill where Joseph and the huntsman happen to be working. She recognizes Joseph by his voice and the two are happily reunited. The fate of Franz is never revealed and it is unclear if the King learns of his youngest son's survival.
- A quote from the story was used as the opening quote for an episode of the NBC series Grimm.
- Elements of the fairy tale were used in the John Connolly's The Book of Lost Things.
- The Indian variant of the folktale Gul-e-Bakavali (The Rose of Bakawali) has been adapted into numerous films in India. These include: Gul-e-Bakavali (1924) by Kanjibhai Rathod, Chatra Bakavali (1926) by Shree Nath Patankar, Bakavali (1930) by Mohanlal D. Shah, Gul-e-Bakavali (1932) by Anand Prasad Kapoor, Chatra Bakavali (1932) by J. J. Madan, Gul Bakaoli (1938) by Barkat Mehra, Gul-E-Bakawali (1939) by D. M. Pancholi, Gul-e-Bakavali (1947) by Rustom Modi, Gul-E-Bakavali (1955) by T. R. Ramanna, Gulebakavali Katha (1962) by N. T. Rama Rao, Gul-e-Bakavali (1963) by Jugal Kishore. Chandramukhi, an Indian television series which aired on DD National in 2007, was also loosely based on the folktale of Gul-e-Bakavali.

== See also ==
- List of fairy tales
- Leaves of Pearls
- Niels and the Giants
- Prunella
- Snow White
- The Bird 'Grip'
- The Bold Knight, the Apples of Youth, and the Water of Life
- The Enchanted Canary
- The Golden Bird
- The Hairy Man
- The King of England and his Three Sons
- The King of Erin and the Queen of the Lonesome Island
- The Rider Of Grianaig, And Iain The Soldier's Son
- The Witch (fairy tale)
- Water and Salt
- Ibong Adarna
- The Singing, Springing Lark
