= Aleksandr Gryunberg-Tsvetinovich =

Aleksandr Gryunberg-Tsvetinovich (Russian: Алекса́ндр Лео́нович Грю́нберг-Цветино́вич; 1 March 1930, Leningrad — 3 March 1995, Saint Petersburg) was a Russian philologist specializing in Indo-Iranian languages and especially the languages of Afghanistan. He studied at the then Leningrad State University Iranian philology. His main fields of study were the grammatic descriptions of living Iranian languages, publication of texts, dictionaries and translations . Aleksandr Gryunberg-Tsvetinovich was the author of around 100 scientific publications.

== Bibliography ==
- Очерк грамматики афганского языка (пашто). Л., 1987.
- Афганистан: Языковая ситуация и языковая политика // Изв. АН СССР. Серия литературы и языка. Т. 47. 1988.
