= Shkhawr =

- Location in Afghanistan
- Coordinates: 36°43′37″N 71°55′21″E
- Country: Afghanistan
- Province: Badakhshan Province
- Time zone: + 4.30

Shkhawr is a village in Badakhshan Province in north-eastern Afghanistan.

The village is inhabited by Wakhi people. The population of the village (2003) is 454.

== See also ==
- Badakhshan Province
