= Bučje (Bor) =

Bučje Бучје
- Village
- Location within Serbia
- Country: Serbia
- District: Bor District
- Municipality: Bor

Population (2022)
  - Total: 467
- Time zone: UTC+1 (CET)
  - Summer (DST): UTC+2 (CEST)

Bučje (Serbian Cyrillic: Бучје) is a village in the municipality of Bor, Serbia. According to the 2022 census, the village has a population of 467 people.
