= Slatina (Bor) =

Slatina Слатина
- Village
- Location within Serbia
- Coordinates: 44°02′24″N 22°09′41″E
- Country: Serbia
- District: Bor District
- Municipality: Bor

Population (2022)
  - Total: 774
- Time zone: UTC+1 (CET)
  - Summer (DST): UTC+2 (CEST)

Slatina (Serbian Cyrillic: Слатина) is a village in the municipality of Bor, Serbia. According to the 2022 census, the village has a population of 774 people.
