= Krivelj =

Krivelj Krivelj / Кривељ (Serbian) Criveli (Romanian)
- Village
- Location within Serbia
- Coordinates: 44°07′46″N 22°05′46″E
- Country: Serbia
- District: Bor District
- Municipality: Bor

Population (2022)
  - Total: 754
- Time zone: UTC+1 (CET)
  - Summer (DST): UTC+2 (CEST)

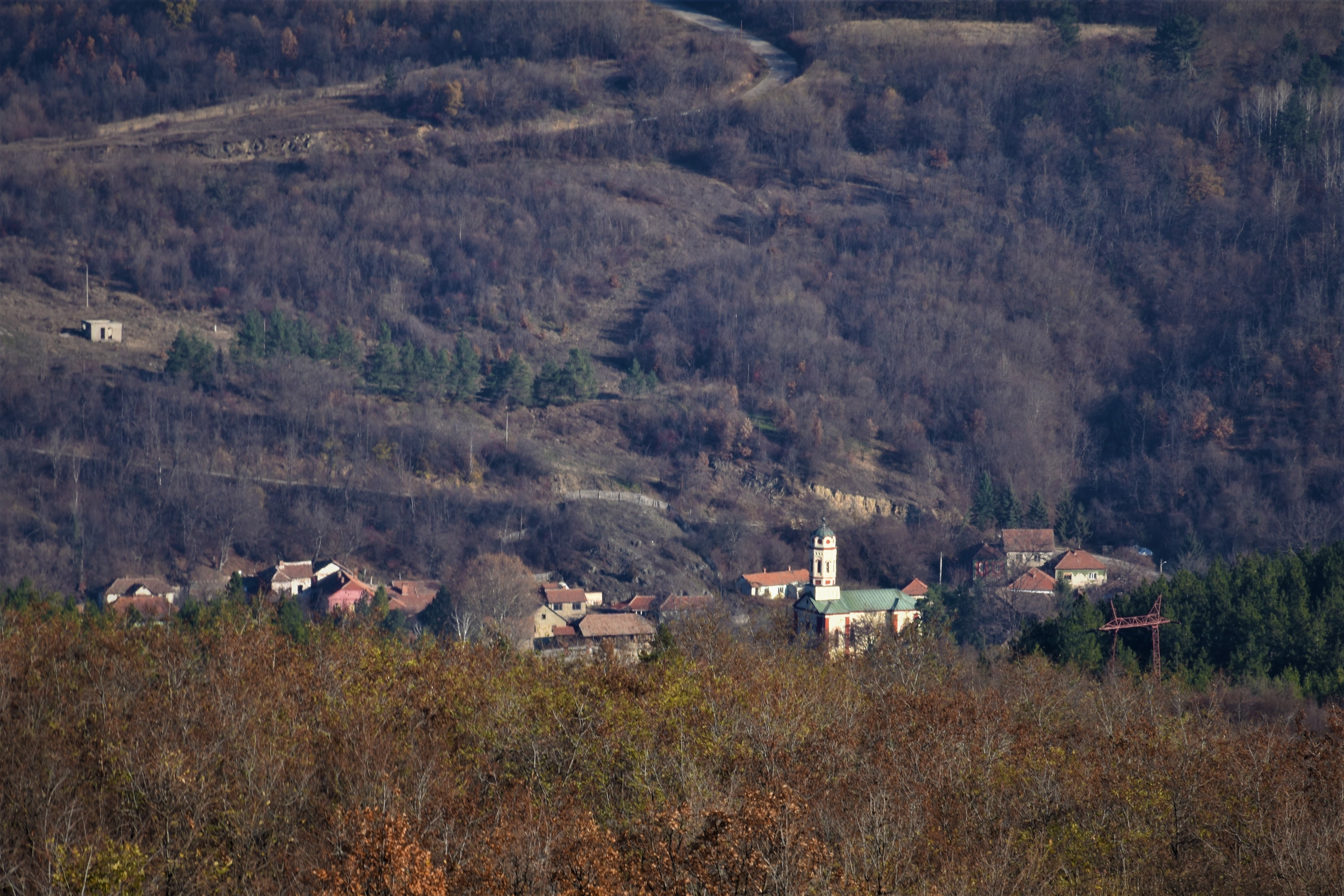
Krivelj

Krivelj (Serbian Cyrillic: Кривељ; Romanian: Criveli) is a village in the municipality of Bor, Serbia. According to the 2022 census, the village has a population of 754 people.
