= Tanda (Bor) =

- Village
- Location within Serbia
- Coordinates: 44°13′56″N 22°08′38″E
- Country: Serbia
- District: Bor District
- Municipality: Bor

Population (2022)
  - Total: 263
- Time zone: UTC+1 (CET)
  - Summer (DST): UTC+2 (CEST)

Tanda (Serbian Cyrillic: Танда) is a village in the municipality of Bor, Serbia. According to the 2022 census the village had a population of 263 people.

== Geography ==
Tanda is a village located in the gorge of the Crnajke River, which the locals also call Valja Mare (Great River). An asphalt road Bor - Miloševa tower - Majdanpek passes through a gorge next to a river. Atar village covers about 40 square kilometers and is surrounded by the Deli Jovan, Stol, Vizak and Gornjansky plateau mountains.
