= Topla, Bor =

Topla
- Village
- Location within Serbia
- Coordinates: 44°08′37″N 22°10′33″E
- Country: Serbia
- District: Bor District
- Municipality: Bor

Population (2002)
  - Total: 100
- Time zone: UTC+1 (CET)
  - Summer (DST): UTC+2 (CEST)

Topla (Serbian Cyrillic: Топла) is a village in the municipality of Bor, Serbia. According to the 2002 census, the village has a population of 100 people. Whereas in 2011 population shrinked to 97 people.
