= Bor, Serbia =

City in Serbia

Bor Бор (Serbian)
- City
- City of Bor
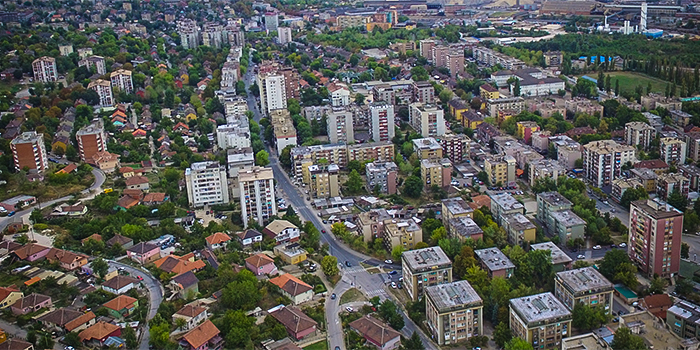
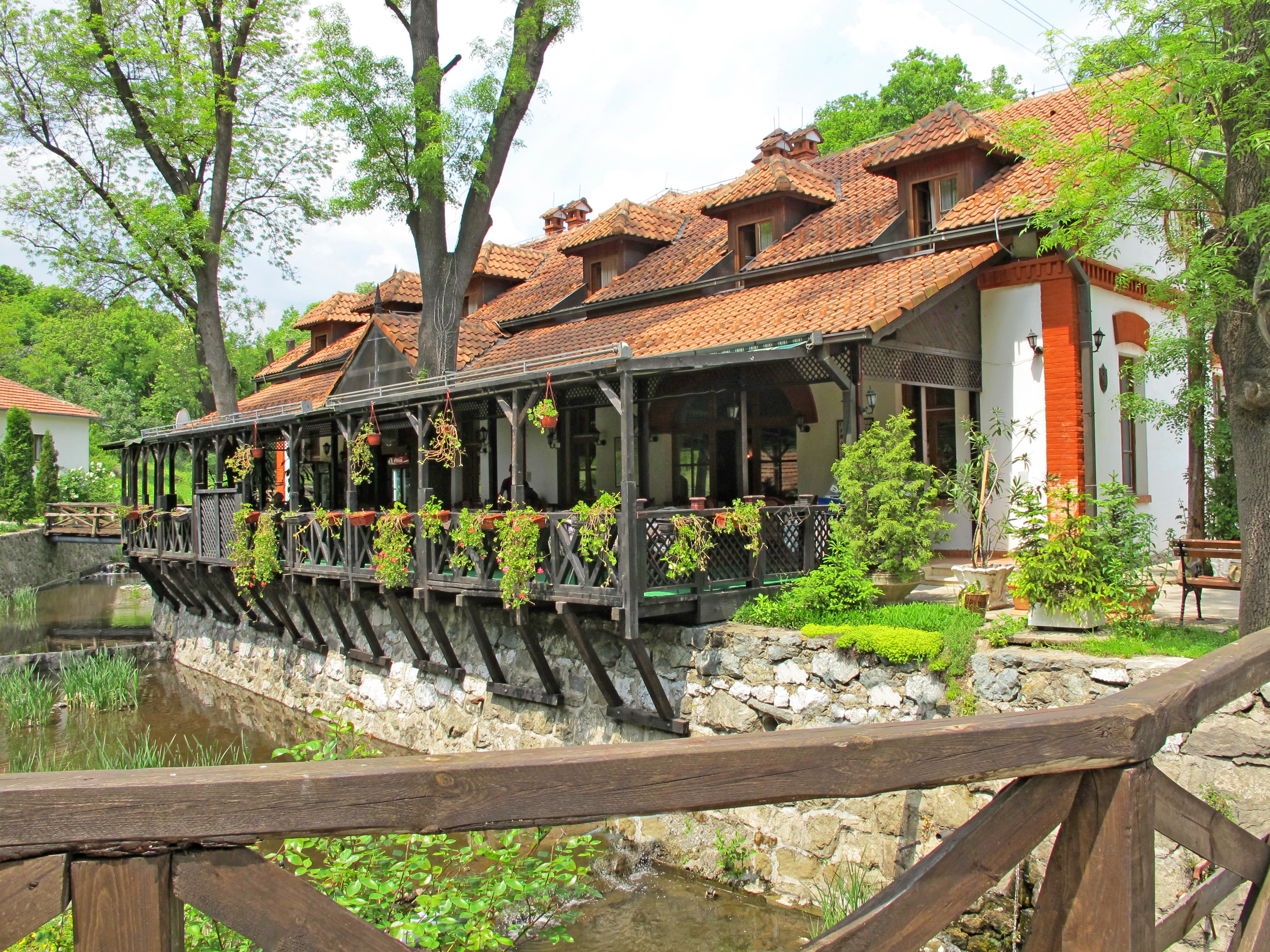
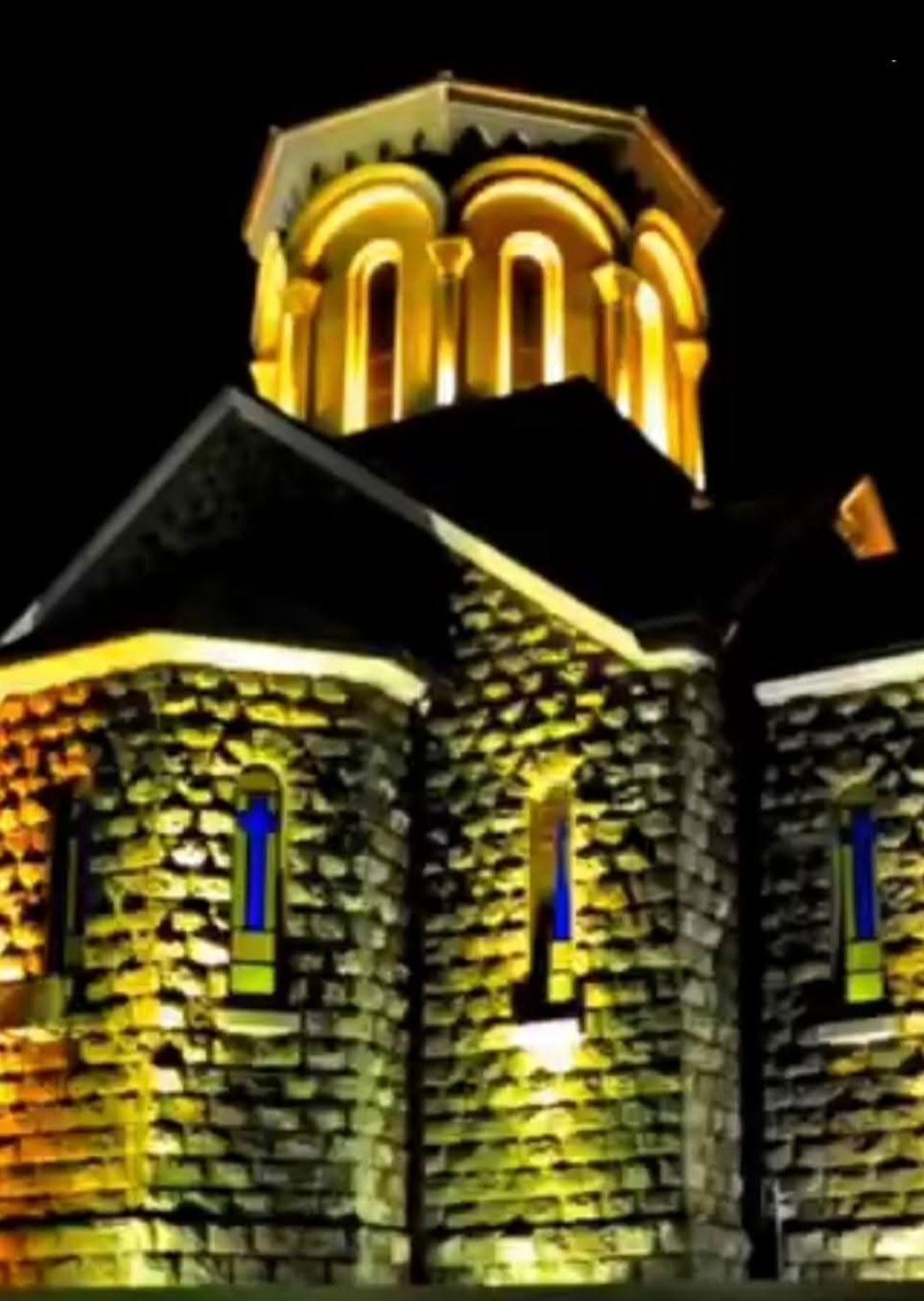
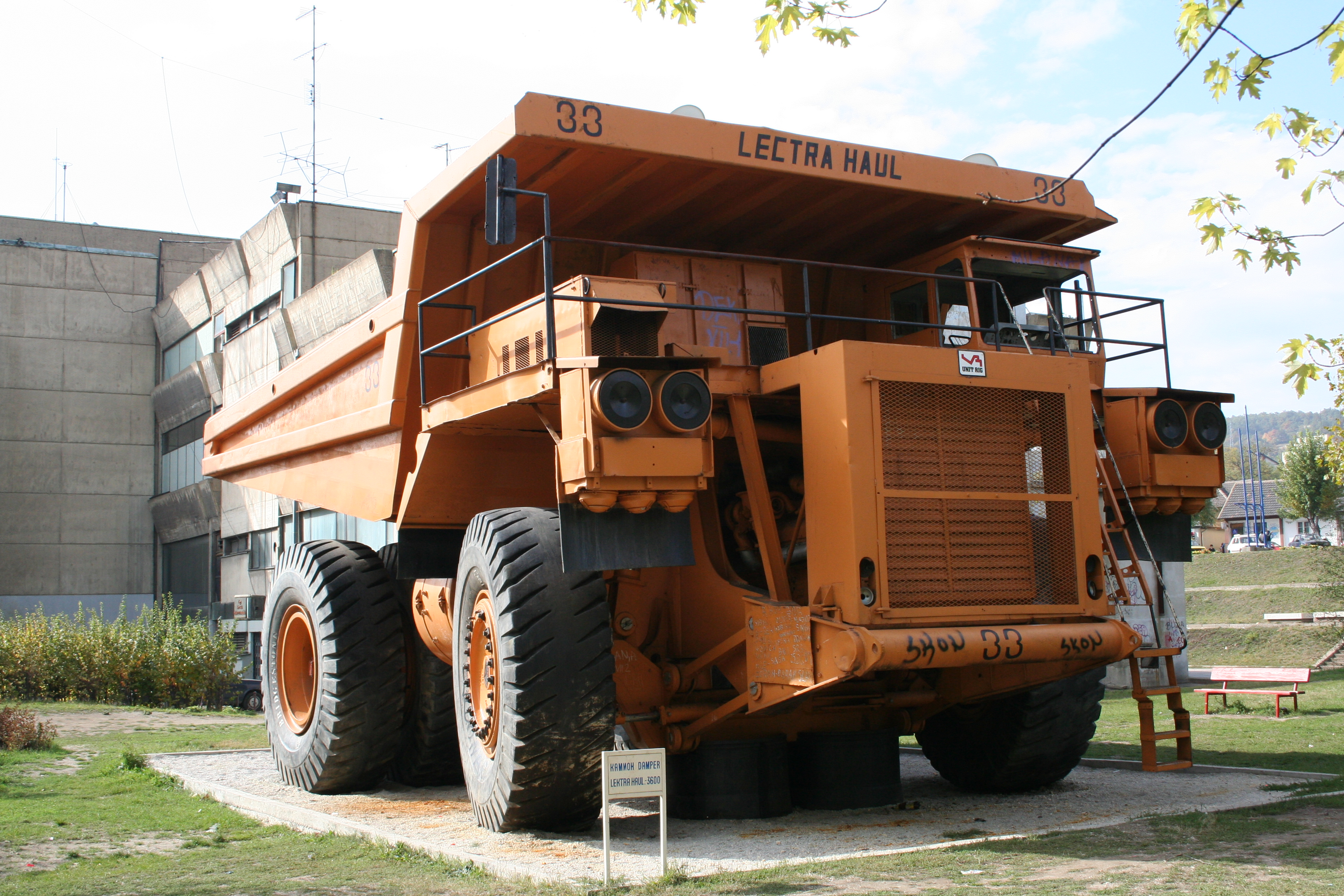
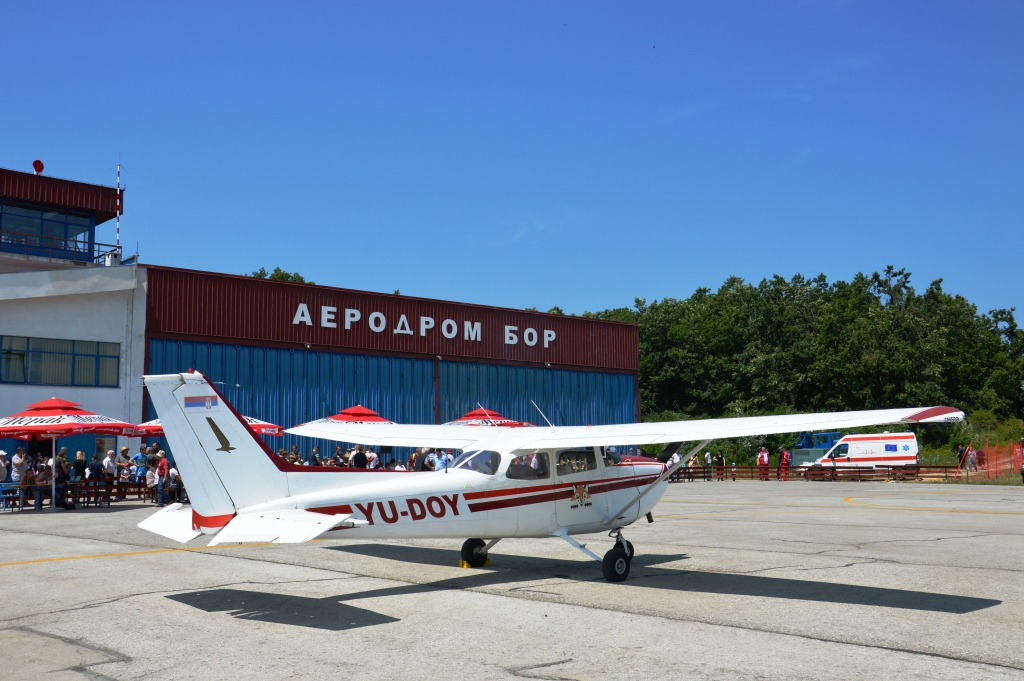
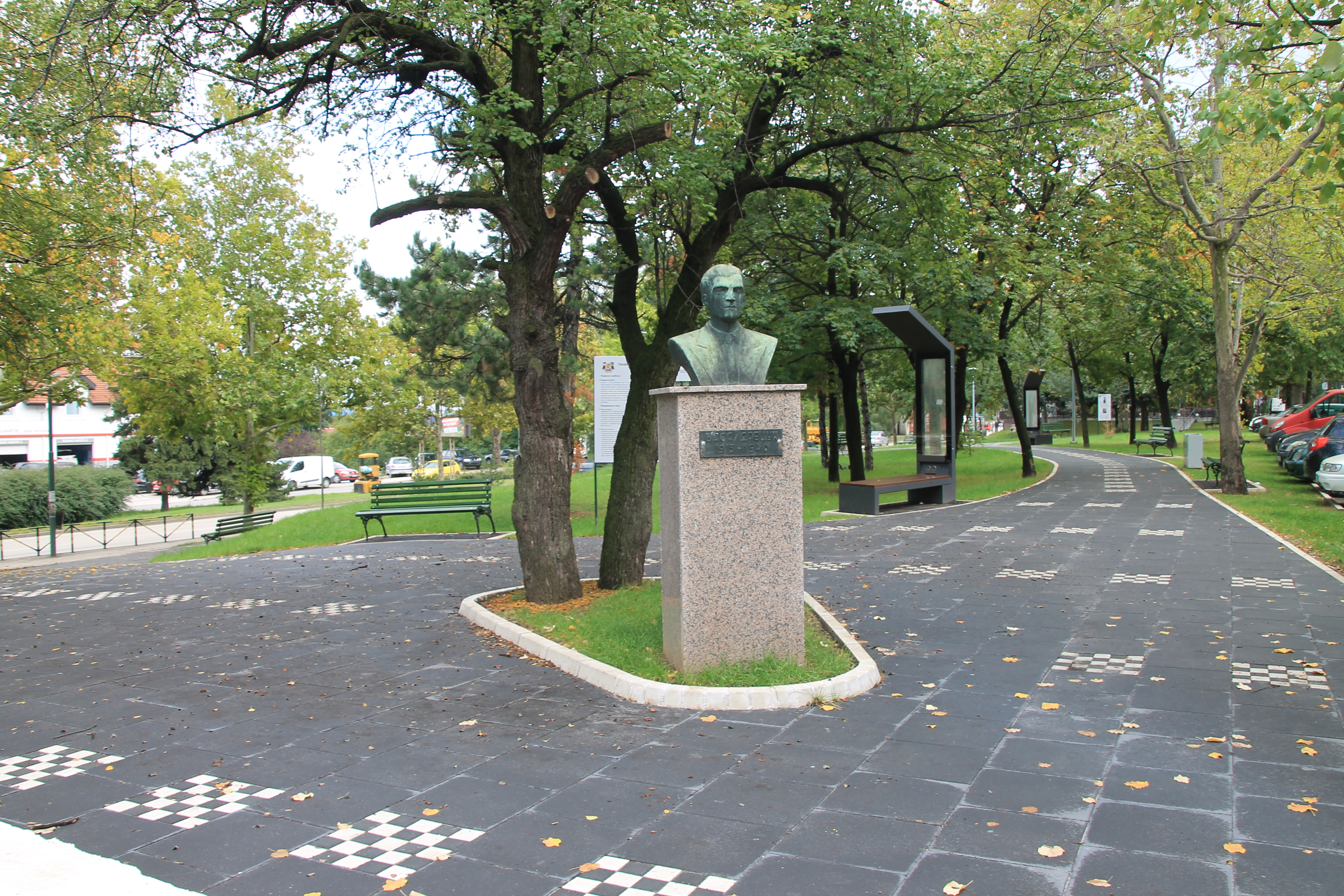
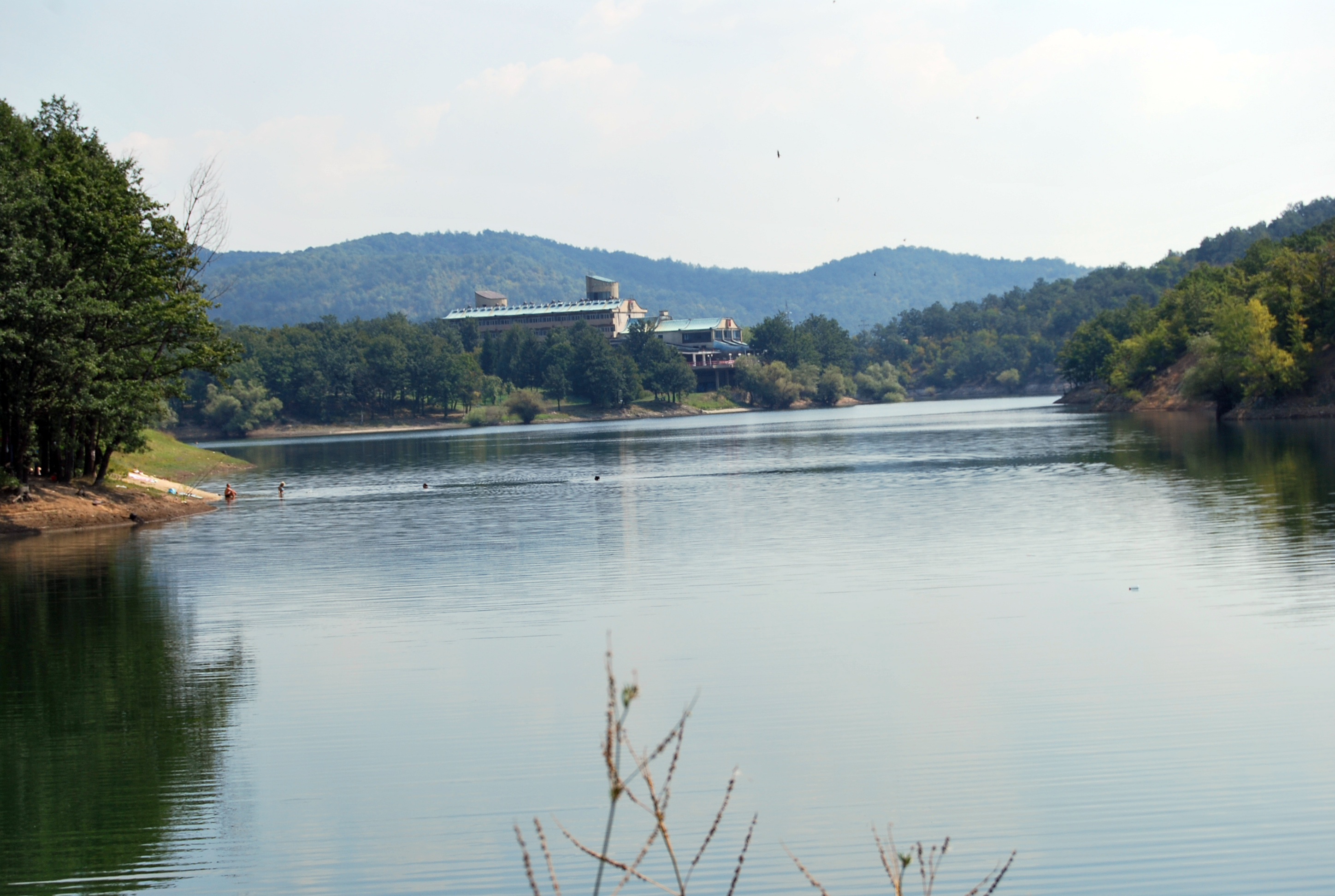
- Panorama of Bor Brestovac Spa St. George Orthodox Church Dumper in Park Museum Bor Airport Ecological Youth Park Hotel near Bor Lake

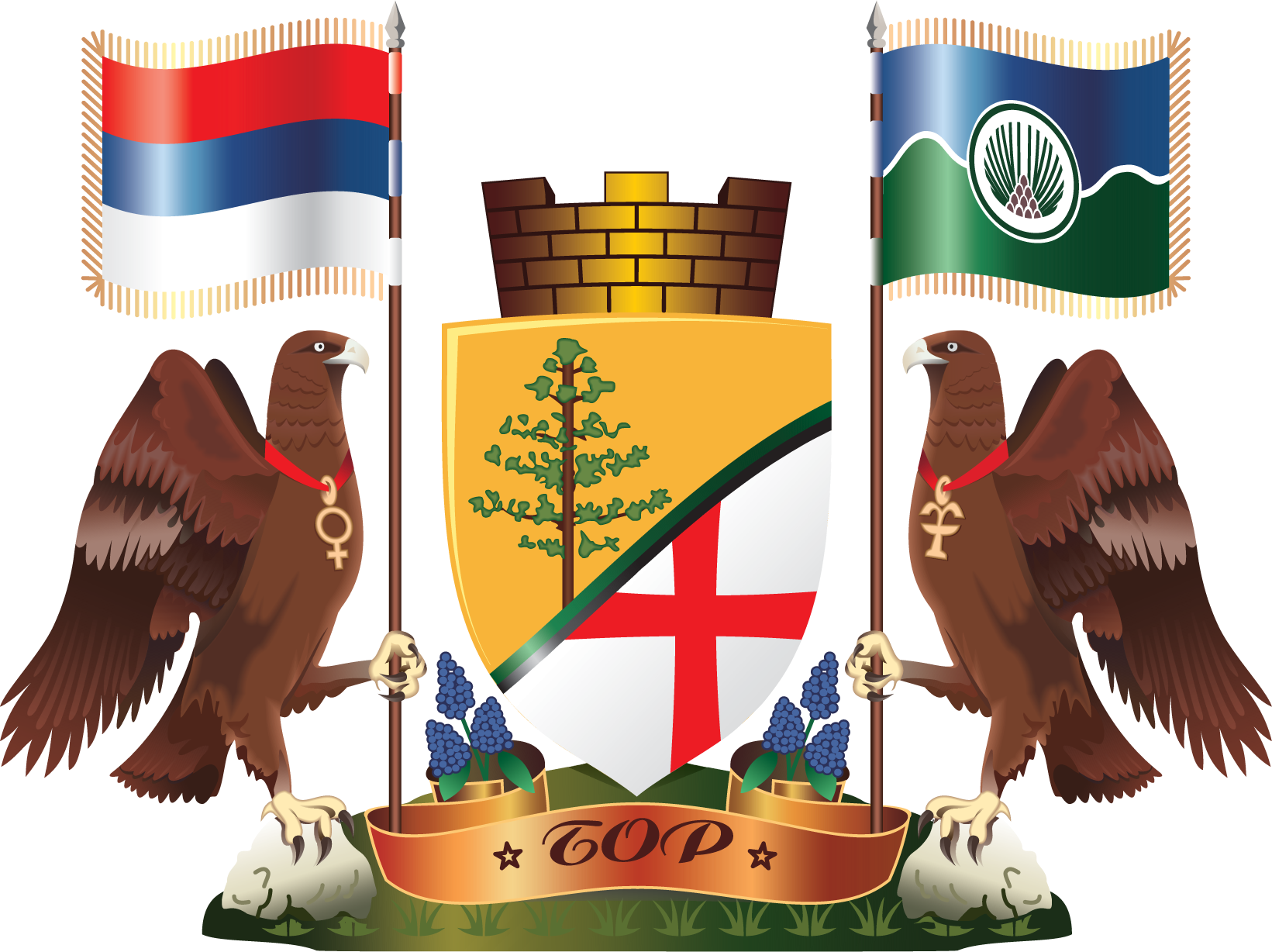
- Flag Coat of arms

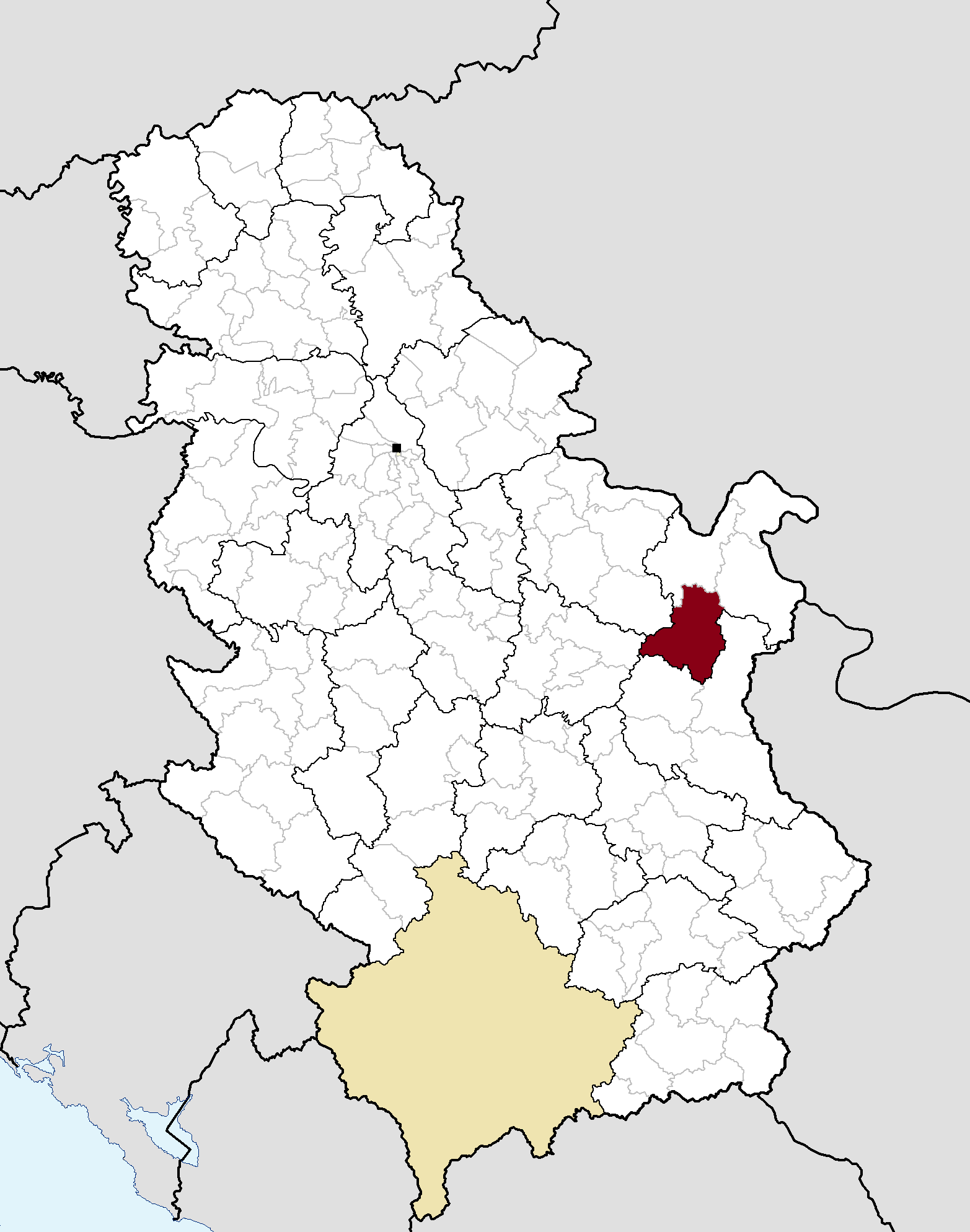
- Location of the city of Bor within Serbia
- Coordinates: 44°05′N 22°06′E
- Country: Serbia
- Region: Southern and Eastern Serbia
- District: Bor
- City status: June 2018
- Settlements: 14

Government
  - Mayor: Aleksandar Milikić (SNS)

Area
  - Urban: 47.62 km^{2} (18.39 sq mi)
  - Administrative: 856 km^{2} (331 sq mi)
- Elevation: 381 m (1,250 ft)

Population (2022 census)
  - Urban: 28,822
  - Urban density: 605.2/km^{2} (1,568/sq mi)
  - Administrative: 40,845
  - Administrative density: 47.7/km^{2} (124/sq mi)
- Time zone: UTC+1 (CET)
  - Summer (DST): UTC+2 (CEST)
- Postal code: 19210
- Area code: +381 30
- Car plates: Serbian
- Website: www.bor.rs

Bor (Serbian Cyrillic: Бор; Romanian: Bor) is a city and the administrative center of the Bor District in eastern Serbia. According to the 2022 census, the city administrative area has a population of 40,845 inhabitants. With 810 residential buildings, it presents the highest ratio of urban area to number of citizens in the country, and is one of top-five cities in Serbia by number of buildings.

Bor has one of the largest copper mines in Europe. It has been a mining center since 1904, when a French company began operations there. It was the center of a Nazi prison camp complex in World War Two.

== Name ==
The name is derived from Serbo-Croatian: bor / бор meaning "pine".

== History ==
In 1835, Miloš Obrenović invited J.G. Herder's son August to the Bor region to carry out geological investigations.

Đorđe Vajfert invested in exploration and sought foreign capital to initiate industrial exploitation. Managing to obtain support for this endeavour, he signed a contract with Mirabaud, and his Compagnie française des mines de Bor was established on 30 September 1903 in Paris.

=== World War Two prison camps ===
On 27 March 1941, Nazi Germany invaded Yugoslavia. Führer’s directive No. 25 mentioned that possession of the Bor copper mines were very important, as they could supply 50 percent of Nazi Germany's wartime copper requirements. Under the justification that Bor copper was supporting the British war industry, ownership of the copper mines was seized from the Compagnie française des mines de Bor and were taken over by the Prussian National Bank.

Prison camps were quickly established, most bearing the names of German cities. The largest camp was named 'Berlin;' it was located in Bor proper and housed the headquarters of the Hungarian battalion. Satellite camps began being built: Innsbruck, Bregenz, Graz, Heidenau, Westfalen, Munich, Vorarlberg, and Rhön were all located within a 50 kilometer radius from Bor. The locations of the Innsbruck, Graz, and Rhön camps remain unknown.

In May 1943, the total number of inmates (excluding Kapos) came to about 23,000 forced laborers from Serbia.

Prisoners in Bor, 1942-1944

=== Jewish Hungarian labor servicemen at Bor ===
Gerhard Fränk, the vice president of Organisation Todt, concocted the idea of utilizing the labor of Hungarian Jews to run the Bor mines: Serbian Jews had already been killed, Serbians could not be trusted because they would resist, Bulgarians were unwilling to work in Serbia or were needed for work in Bulgaria; this left Hungarian Jews as a viable labor force. He, along with other Germans in Organisation Todt and Nazi-aligned Hungarian politicians like Ferenc Szombathelyi and Miklós Kállay, began working to appropriate Hungarian Jewish labor servicemen in February of 1943. They met a roadblock in Vilmos Nagy, the Hungarian Minister of Defense, who was opposed to the plan and was in de facto and de jure control of all labor service battalions. Their plans only progressed after his resignation on 8 June 1943.

Less than a month following Nagy's resignation, the Hungarian government and Organisation Todt reached an agreement, in which 6,000 labor servicemen would be sent to Bor for work in the mines. In exchange, the Germans would provide monthly shipment of 100 tons of copper ore. In June of 1944, 3,250 more labor servicemen were sent from Hungary to Bor. The vast majority of the Bor labor servicemen were Jews, although Jehovah's Witnesses and Seventh-Day Adventists were also present; one of the 16 units (Special Company no. 801) originally sent to Bor was composed of Jehovah's Witnesses.

Hungarian labor servicemen were categorized into four labor groups based on (in part) their capacity for labor: the physically frail were given light tasks, a second group were tasked with unloading cargo and construction; the final two companies were made to clear the tracks for a railroad over Crni Vrh.

=== Evacuation of prisoners ===
As part of the Axis retreat from Yugoslavia, Hungarian labor servicemen were evacuated on death marches to Germany accompanied by Hungarian armed guards in September and October of 1944. Many were shot along the way, including the mass murder of 700–1,000 Jews into a mass grave over the course of six hours during the night of October 7–8 in the Glaeser Welker Rauch brickyard in Crvenka. Three columns of servicemen evacuated Bor, heading for the Hungarian-German border, where they were intended to be used to build the South-east wall or to depart to concentration camps such as Flossenburg, Oranienburg, and Sachsenhausen. One of those evacuated from Bor and executed en route to Germany was Miklós Radnóti, a Jewish Hungarian poet. He was shot at Abda between November 6 and 10, 1944. His final poems were found in his raincoat after his corpse was exhumed from a mass grave.

On 17 September, a column of 3,600 labor servicemen left Bor under the control of 100 Hungarian guards. They marched via Belgrade, Novi Sad, Zombor, and Mohács before being deported to Germany by train at Szentkirályszabadja.

A second group, numbering some 2,500 Hungarian labor servicemen, departed on 19 September. A mass escape was attempted near Pančevo; of the 148 escapees, 147 were caught and executed. A week later, at Crvenka, 700–1,000 other prisoners were shot into a pit. Those that survived the ordeals of the march were deported from Baja to Germany.

On 16 September, a second column of 3,000 prisoners left the camp under supreme command of SS-Polizei-Gebirgsjäger-Regiment Nr. 18 on the same route to Baja. In Pančevo, supreme command had been taken over by paramilitary operation echelon Deutsche Mannschaft and Volksdeutsche Ordnungspolizei. During both marches, exhausted prisoners were murdered by the roadside.

Some Danube Swabian officials including family members also took the opportunity to escape by train from Baja. During both forced marches, there were several attacks carried out by Yugoslavian Partisans south of Danube river. Some prisoners took the opportunity to flee to the partisans and thus found life-saving protection.

=== Later history ===
In 1947, Bor received urban status from the political authorities. At the time its population was 11,000.

In June 2018, Bor gained the status of a city, along with Prokuplje.

== Geography ==
The town is bordered by the Kriveljska River, and in its vicinity lies a reservoir, Bor Lake.

=== Climate ===
Bor has a humid continental climate (Köppen climate classification: Dfb) with warm summers, cold winters and uniformly distributed precipitation throughout the year

Climate data for Bor
Month	Jan	Feb	Mar	Apr	May	Jun	Jul	Aug	Sep	Oct	Nov	Dec	Year
Mean daily maximum °C (°F)	1.6 (34.9)	3.8 (38.8)	9.6 (49.3)	15.4 (59.7)	20.1 (68.2)	23.9 (75.0)	26.3 (79.3)	26.4 (79.5)	20.8 (69.4)	14.6 (58.3)	8.6 (47.5)	3.3 (37.9)	14.5 (58.2)
Daily mean °C (°F)	−1.8 (28.8)	0.0 (32.0)	4.9 (40.8)	10.6 (51.1)	15.5 (59.9)	19.4 (66.9)	21.6 (70.9)	21.6 (70.9)	16.4 (61.5)	10.5 (50.9)	5.1 (41.2)	0.0 (32.0)	10.3 (50.6)
Mean daily minimum °C (°F)	−4.8 (23.4)	−3.5 (25.7)	0.3 (32.5)	5.7 (42.3)	10.5 (50.9)	14.5 (58.1)	16.6 (61.9)	16.7 (62.1)	12.1 (53.8)	6.9 (44.4)	2.3 (36.1)	−2.7 (27.1)	6.2 (43.2)
Average precipitation mm (inches)	60 (2.4)	56 (2.2)	67 (2.6)	80 (3.1)	86 (3.4)	85 (3.3)	75 (3.0)	57 (2.2)	63 (2.5)	62 (2.4)	66 (2.6)	68 (2.7)	825 (32.4)
Source: Climate-Data.org

=== Flora and fauna ===
The Lazar's Canyon is home to several rare plants – Crimean pine, relic species of Taxus and Serbian ramonda, and animals like Chamois, Golden eagles, and Peregrine falcons.

== Settlements ==
Aside from the city proper area, the city includes the following settlements:

- Brestovac
- Bučje
- Gornjane
- Donja Bela Reka
- Zlot
- Krivelj
- Luka
- Metovnica
- Oštrelj
- Slatina
- Tanda
- Topla
- Šarbanovac
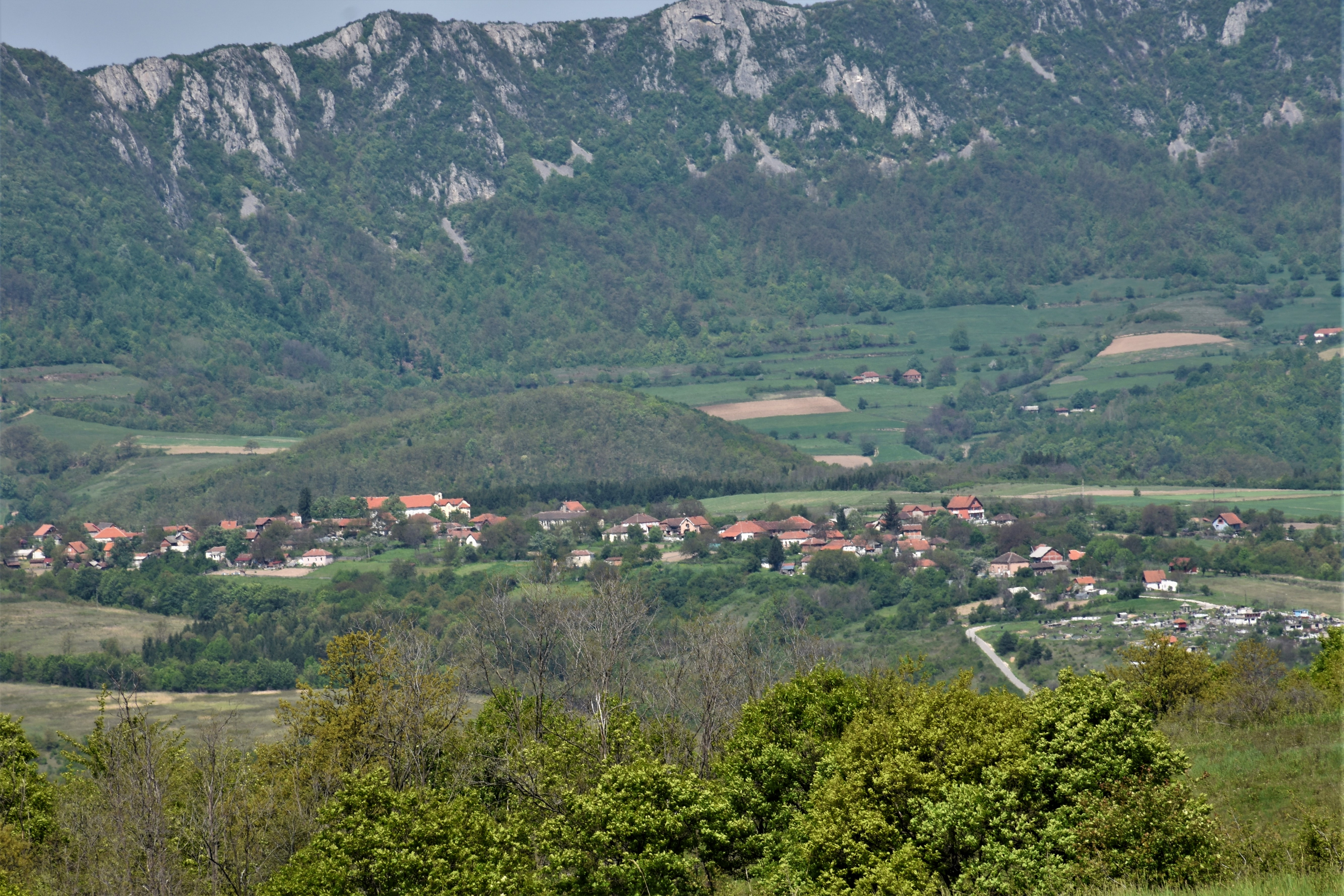
Gornjane

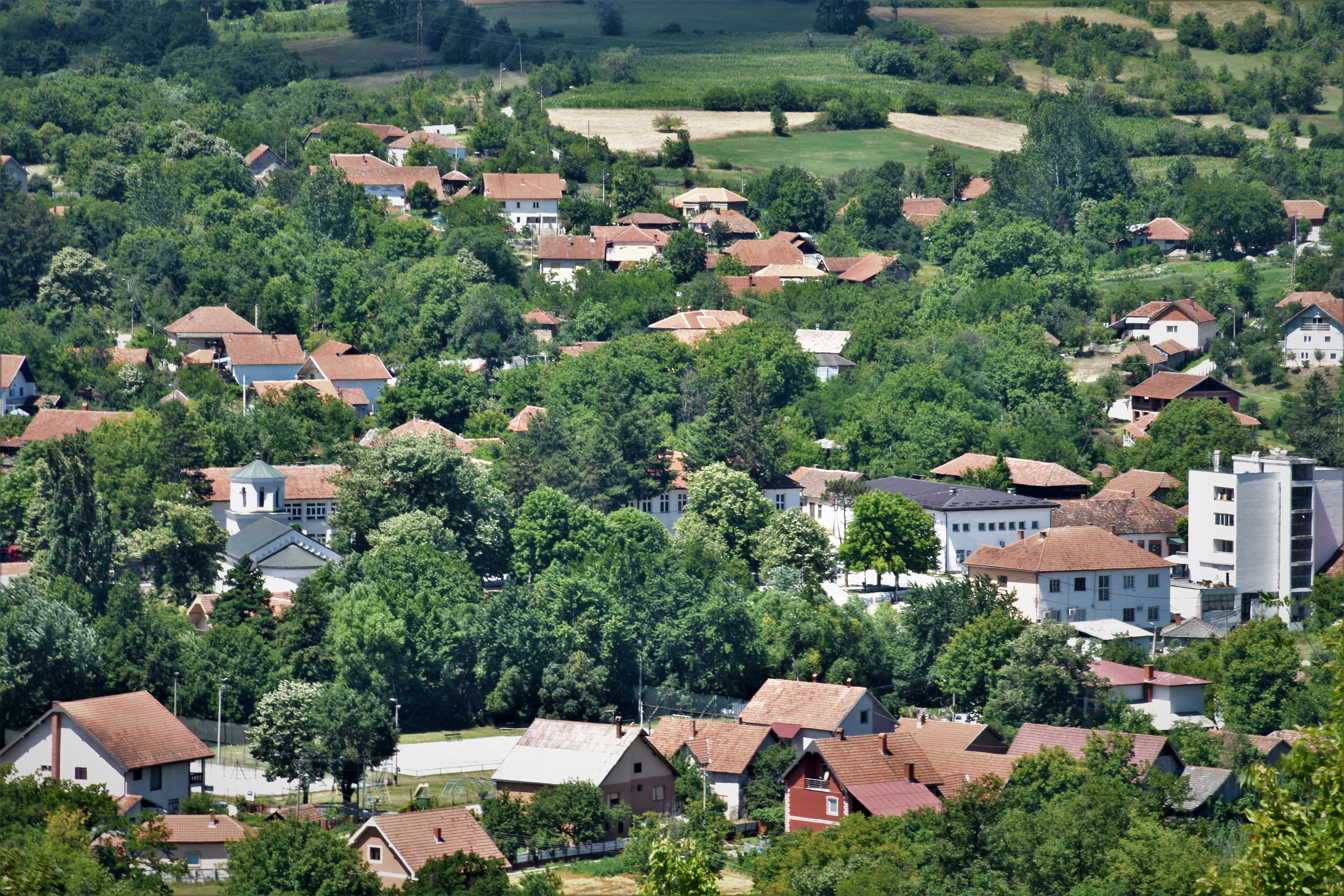
Zlot

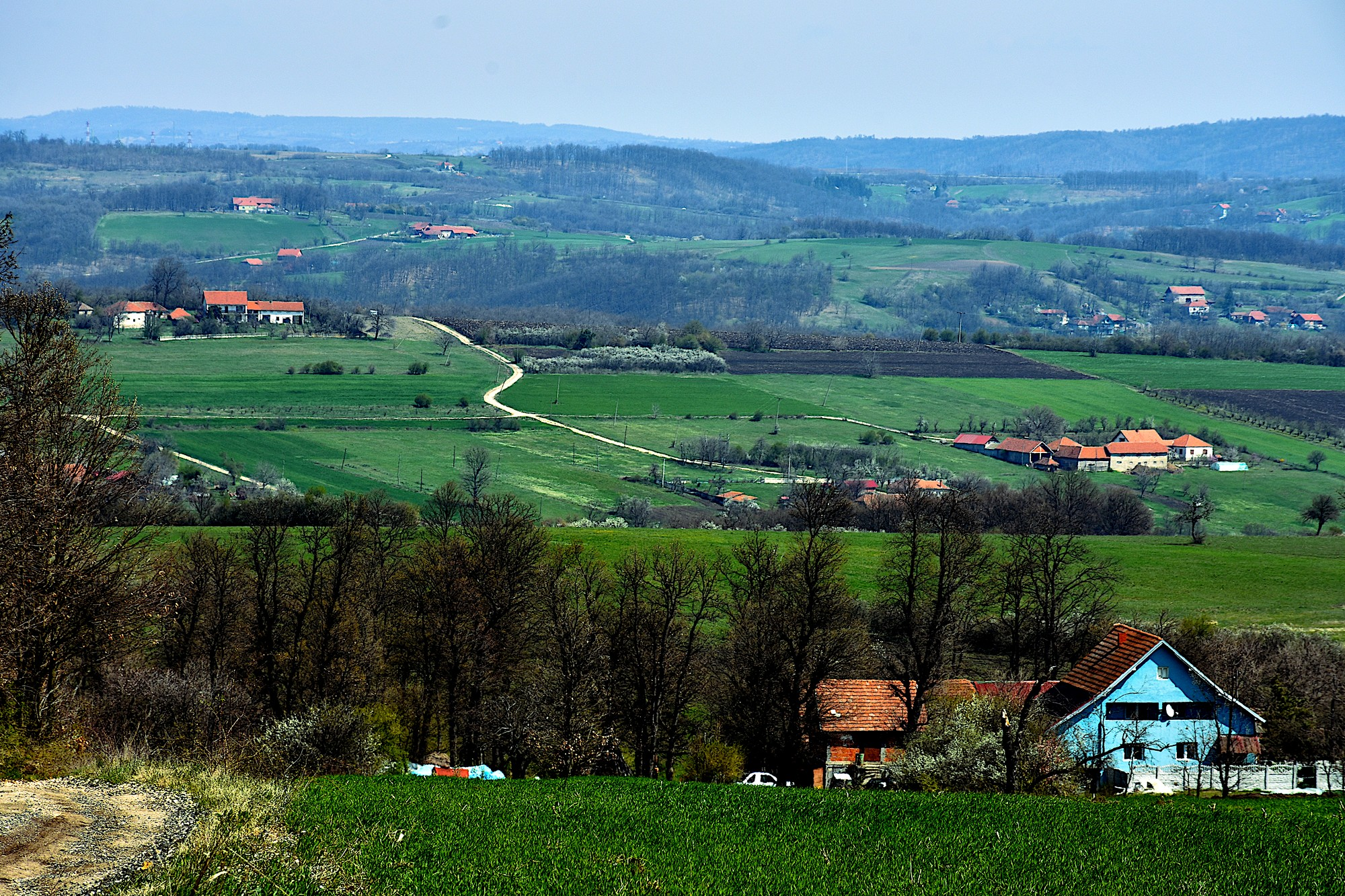
Metovnica

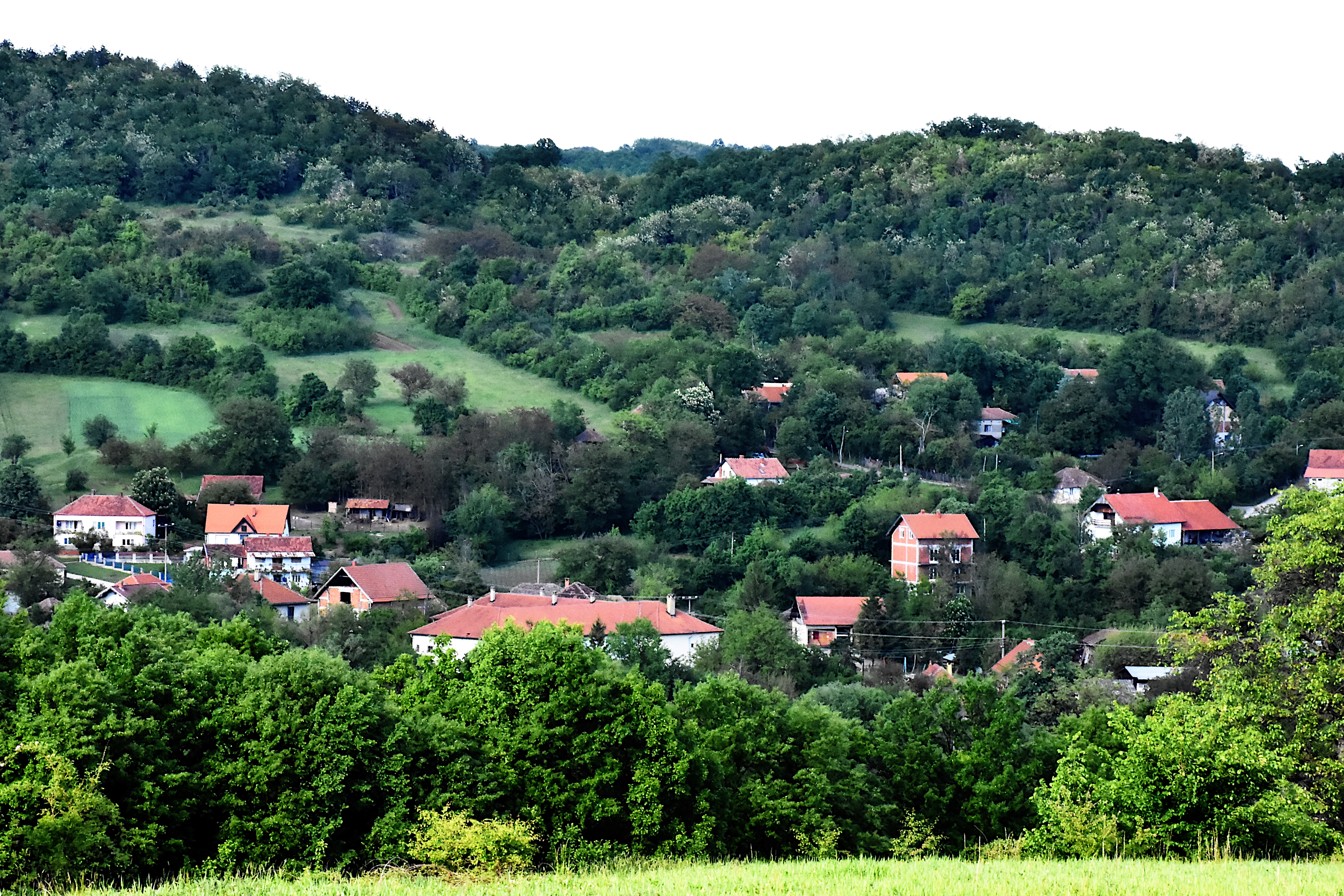
Šarbanovac

== Demographics ==
Historical population
Year	Pop.	±% p.a.
1863	15,913	—
1900	22,557	+0.95%
1931	28,514	+0.76%
1948	34,831	+1.18%
1953	38,688	+2.12%
1961	43,448	+1.46%
1971	52,849	+1.98%
1981	56,486	+0.67%
1991	59,900	+0.59%
2002	55,817	−0.64%
2011	48,615	−1.52%
2022	40,845	−1.57%

According to the 1910, 1931 and 1971 censuses, the inhabitants of the urban area of Bor numbered 2,613 in 1910, 4,749 in 1931 and 29,118 residents in 1971. According to the 2011 census, the population of Bor numbered 48,615 residents, while the urban area of Bor had 34,160 residents.

=== Ethnic groups ===
With a total of 32 different ethnic groups being represented among the population, Bor is one of the most ethnically mixed cities in Serbia. According to the 2011 census, the settlements in the city of Bor with a Serbian ethnic majority were: Bor, Brestovac, Donja Bela Reka, and Oštrelj. The settlements with an ethnic Vlachs majority were: Bučje, Gornjane, Krivelj, Luka, Metovnica, Tanda, Topla, and Šarbanovac. Ethnically mixed settlements were: Zlot (relative Serb majority) and Slatina (relative Vlachs majority).

The ethnic composition of the city:

Ethnic group	2002 census	2011 census	2022 census
Serbs	39,989	35,435	29,322
Vlachs	10,064	6,701	4,483
Roma	1,259	1,758	1,440
Macedonians	540	429	216
Romanians	107	293	356
Albanians	115	113	87
Others	3,743	3,886	4,375
Total	55,817	48,615	40,845

Ethnic groups in Bor include also Bosniaks, Bulgarians, Gorani, Bunjevci, Yugoslavs, Montenegrins, Croatians, Slovenians, Hungarians, ethnic Muslims, Germans, Greeks, Slovaks, Russians, Rusyns, Chinese, Ukrainians, Italians, Turks, Ashkali, Czechs, Poles, Jews, Canadians, and Belarusians.

As the official number does not include foreign nationals, who are present in large numbers in Bor and its surroundings (especially the Chinese, who are estimated at 8,000-10,000), as well as workers from other countries (Turkey, India, Indonesia, African countries). Many people who work in Bor also immigrated from other parts of Serbia, but kept their residence in the place they came from, that are also not included in the official number.

=== Religion ===
Bor has a diverse religious landscape, with the majority of the population identifying as Orthodox Christian, but also including significant minorities of Muslims, Roman Catholics, Protestants, as well as Jews and other smaller religious groups. Other than Orthodox churches, in Bor there are a Roman Chatolic Church, the Mosque, Adventist Church.

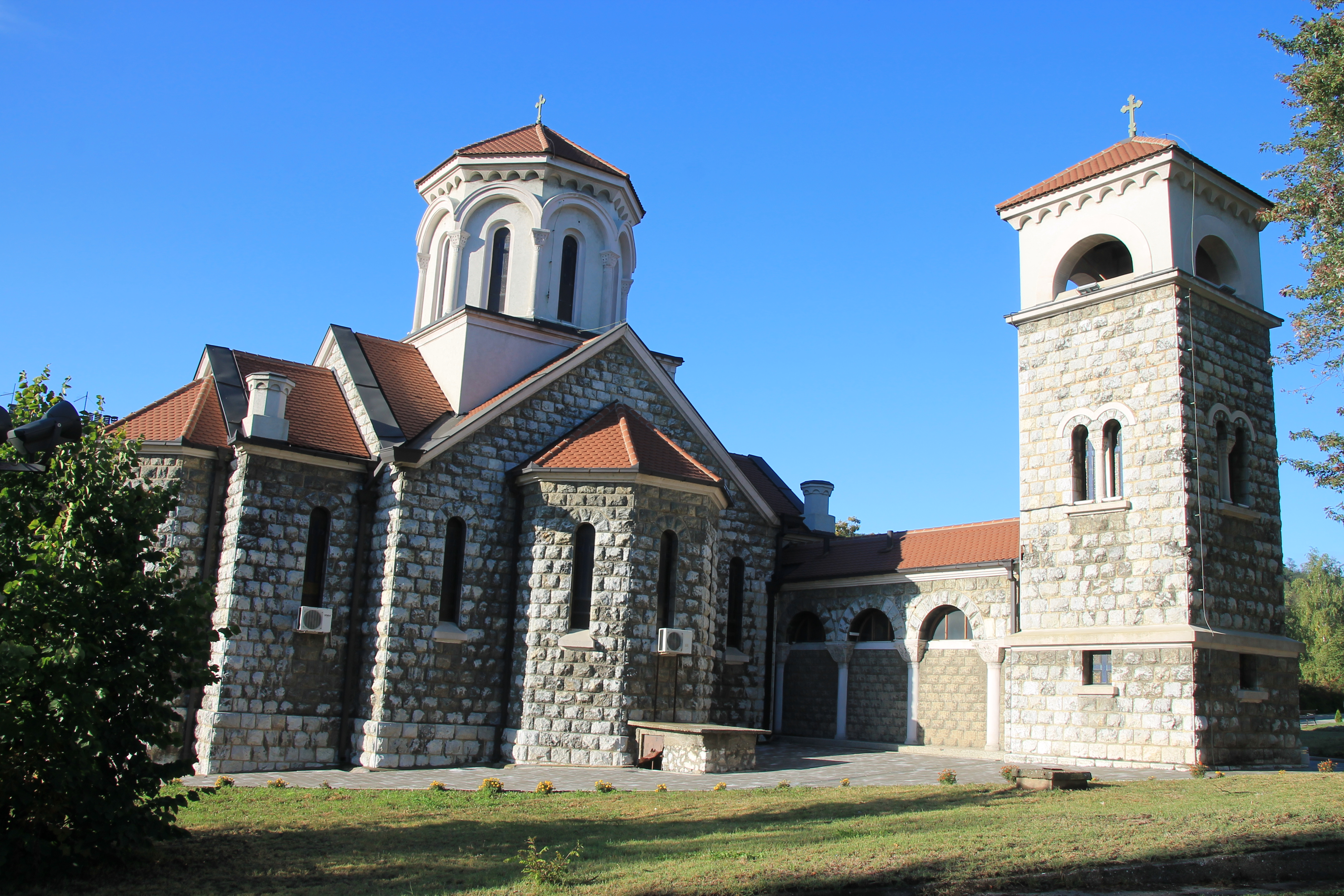
St. George Orthodox Church

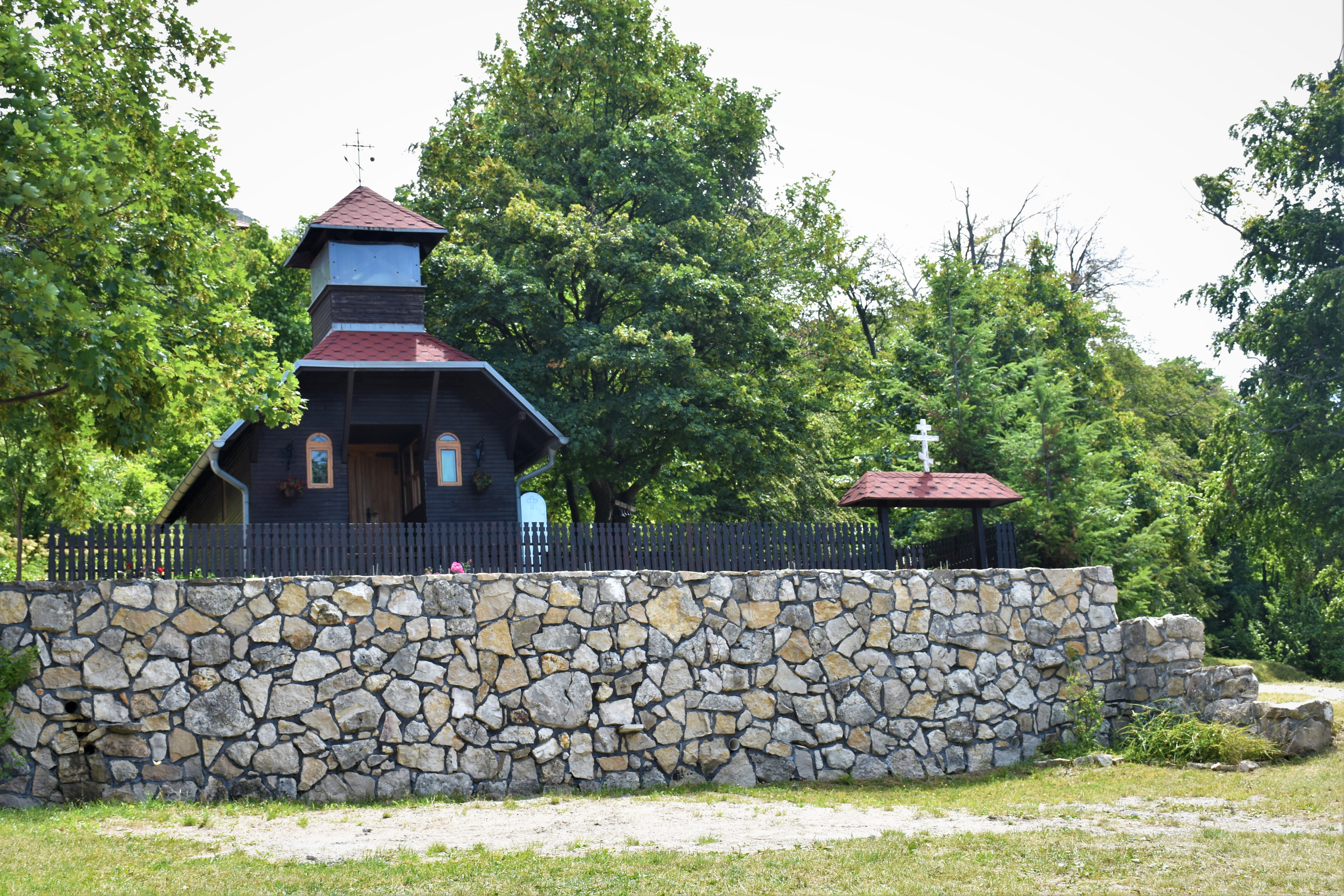
Novi Stjenik Monastery

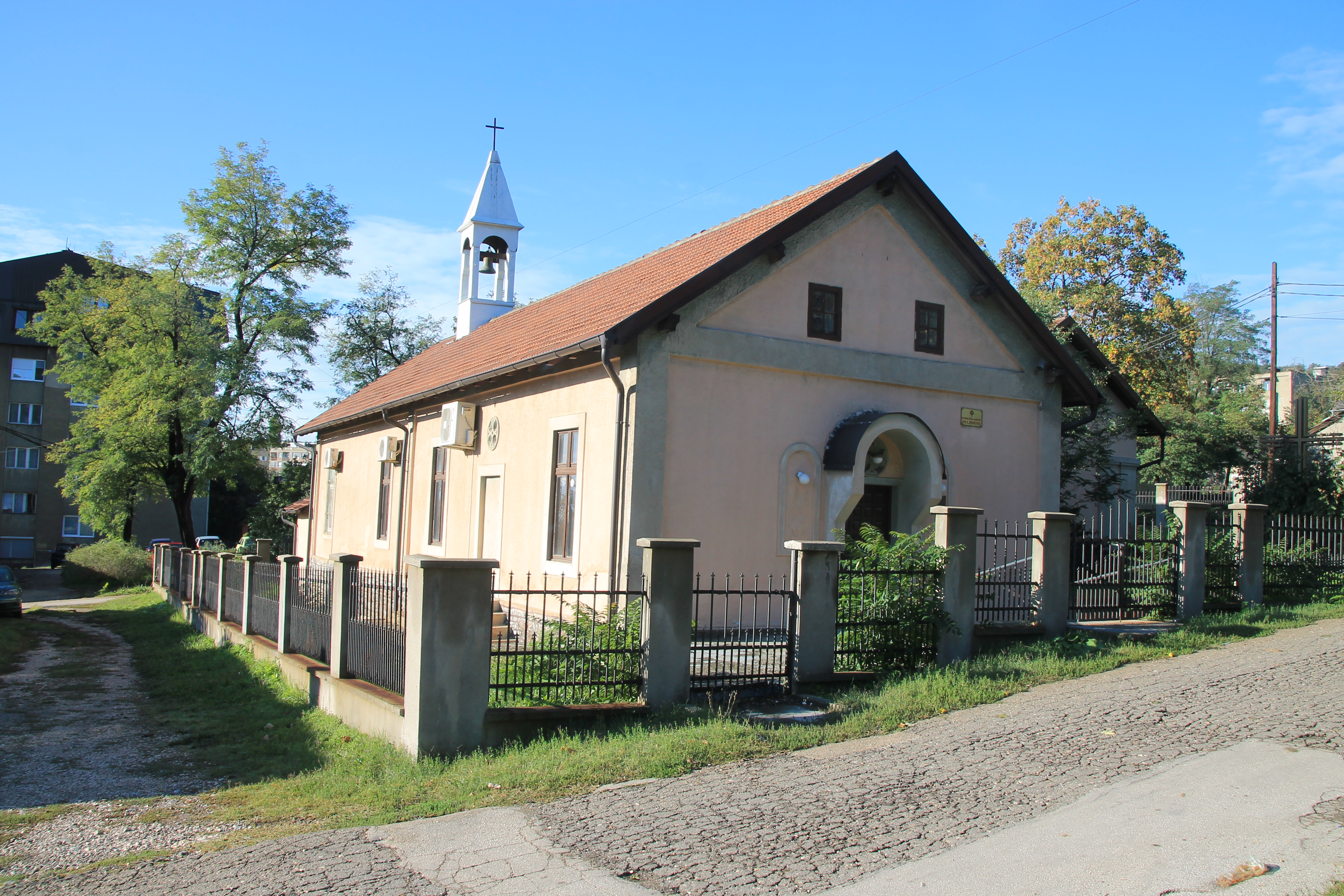
Saint Louis Catholic Church

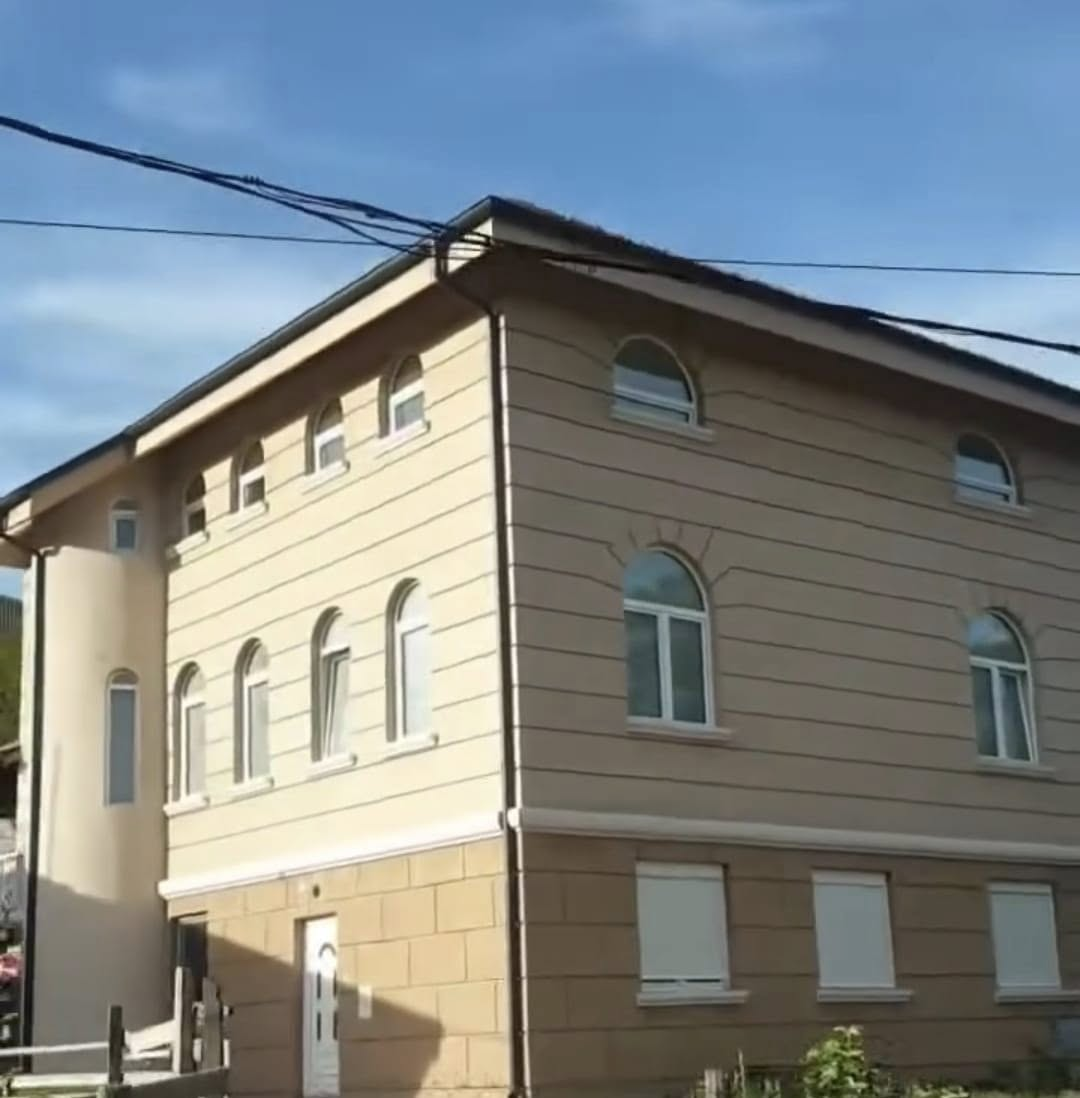
Mosque Madinah

== Economy ==
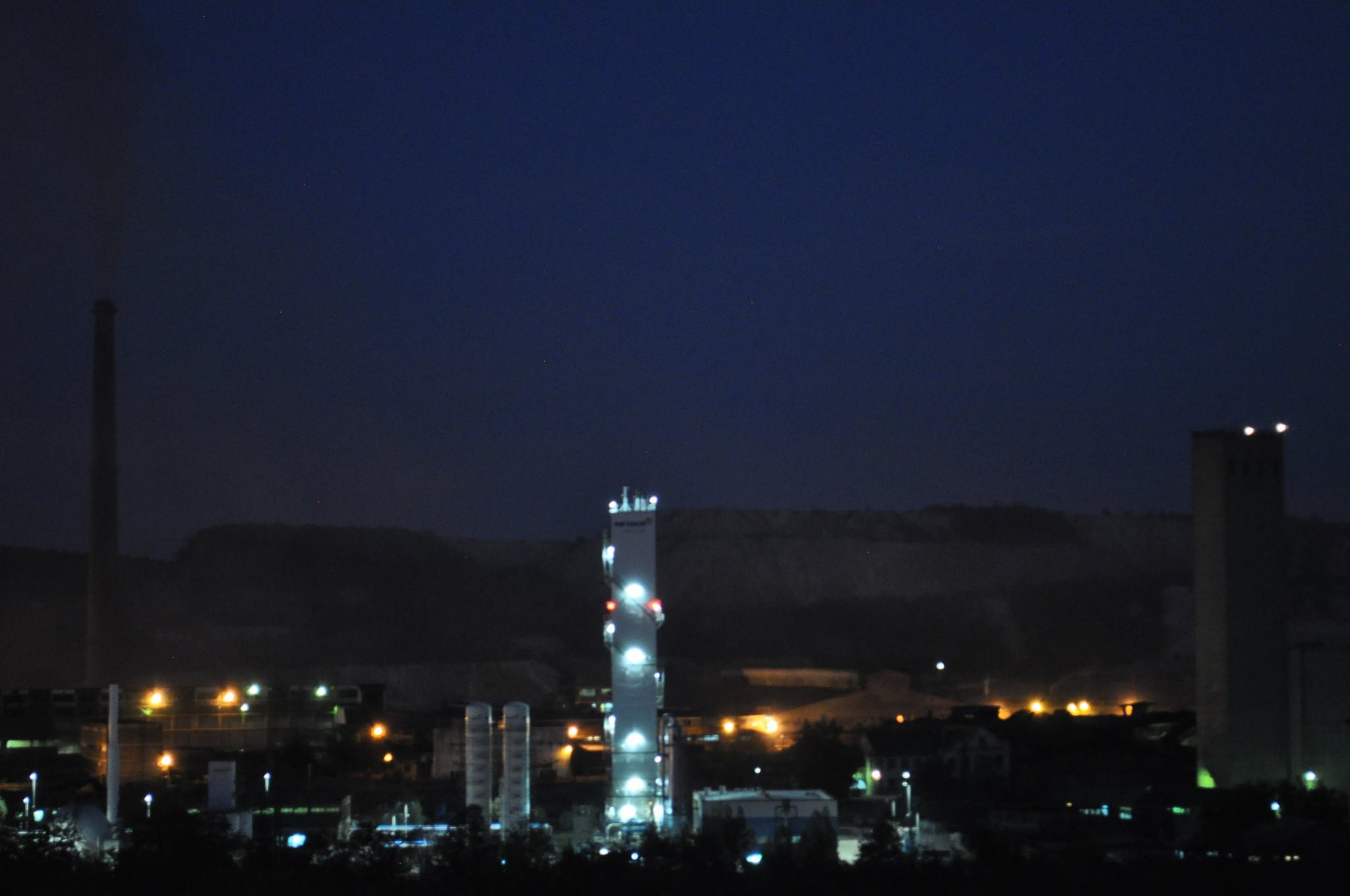
"Cold box" - Messer Tehnogas AD Bor

Copper mining, mainly by the biggest employer Zijin Bor Copper, is the key basis of Bor's economy. On 31 August 2018, a Chinese mining company Zijin Mining took over 63% of the shares of the company RTB Bor, in a $1.26 billion deal with the Government of Serbia. A few Canadian companies operated in Bor, like Nevsun Resources, Dundee, Rakita and Avala resources, while the new smelter and sulfuric acid plant for RTB Bor were built by Canada's SNC Lavalin. Many companies from Canada, led to Canadians settling in the city and thus formed a new ethnic group in Bor. It is supposed that there are up to 10000 Chinese workers, as well those from Turkey, India, Indonesia, African countries etc. Apart from mining, some other companies that operate in Bor are Messer Tehnogas AD, Jinshan Construction, Drillex International, Sayin Construction, CCMC, Wolong ATB FOD, IT Center Bor, Metalka, Keramika Bor, Sandvik, Xella Sverige, Securitas, Epiroc etc. Bor is one of the wealthies cities in Serbia. In 2025, the average gross monthly wage in the city of Bor was US$1750 (€1500, 175687 RSD, 12455 CNY, 73200 Turkish liras) - as of July 2025.

The following table gives a preview of total number of registered people employed in legal entities per their core activity (as of 2024):

Activity	Total
Agriculture, forestry and fishing	76
Mining and quarrying	7,070
Manufacturing	2,580
Electricity, gas, steam and air conditioning supply	328
Water supply; sewerage, waste management and remediation activities	511
Construction	1,422
Wholesale and retail trade, repair of motor vehicles and motorcycles	1,187
Transportation and storage	559
Accommodation and food services	457
Information and communication	161
Financial and insurance activities	125
Real estate activities	31
Professional, scientific and technical activities	667
Administrative and support service activities	287
Public administration and defense; compulsory social security	718
Education	853
Human health and social work activities	1,169
Arts, entertainment and recreation	238
Other service activities	170
Registered individual agricultural workers	43
Total	18,655

== Education ==
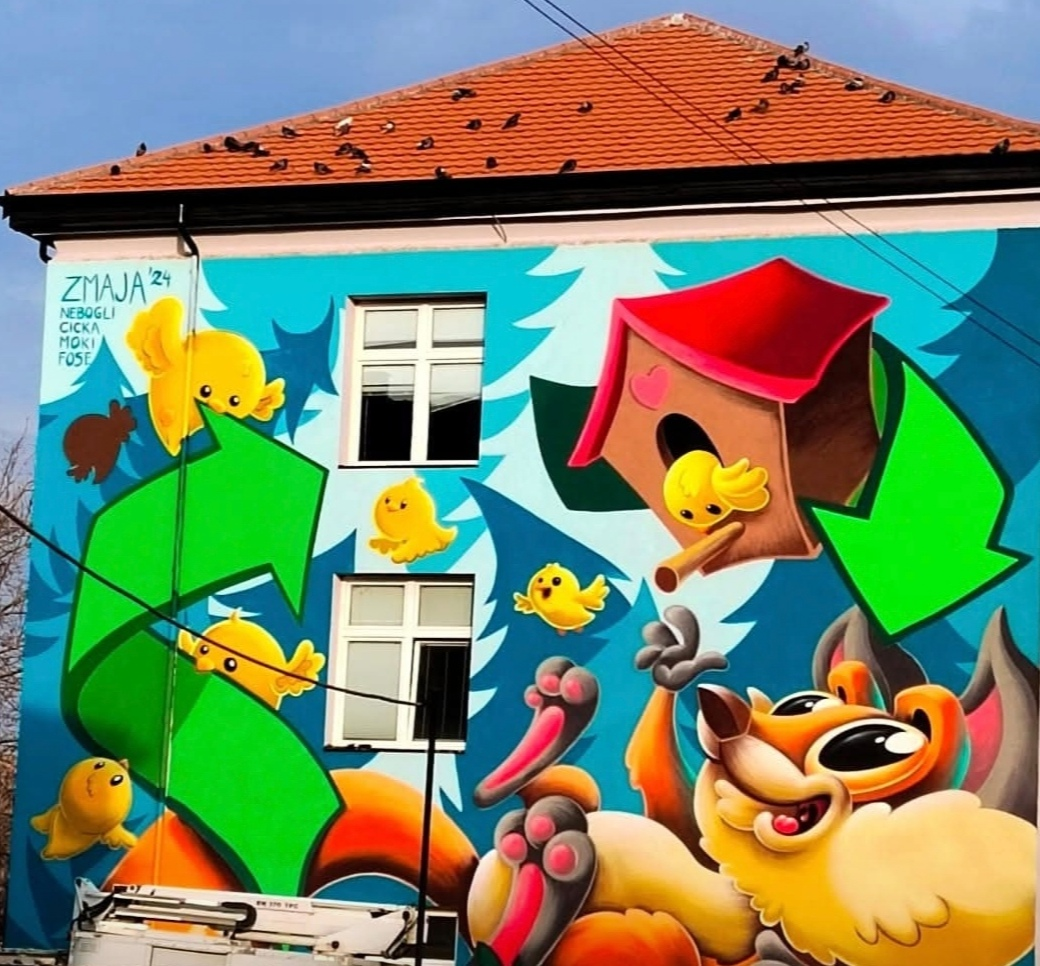
Painted wall, St. Sava School

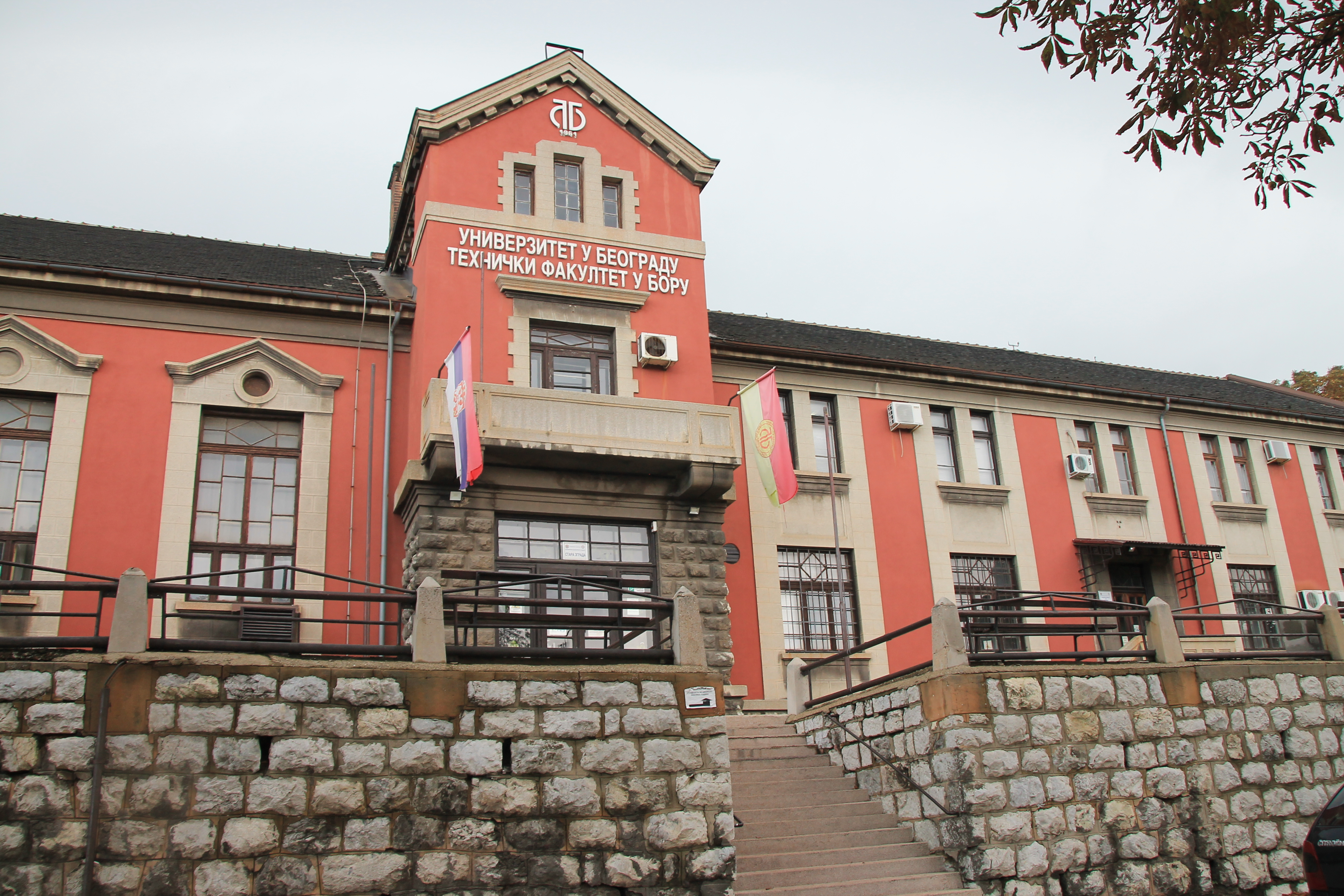
Technical Faculty, University of Belgrade

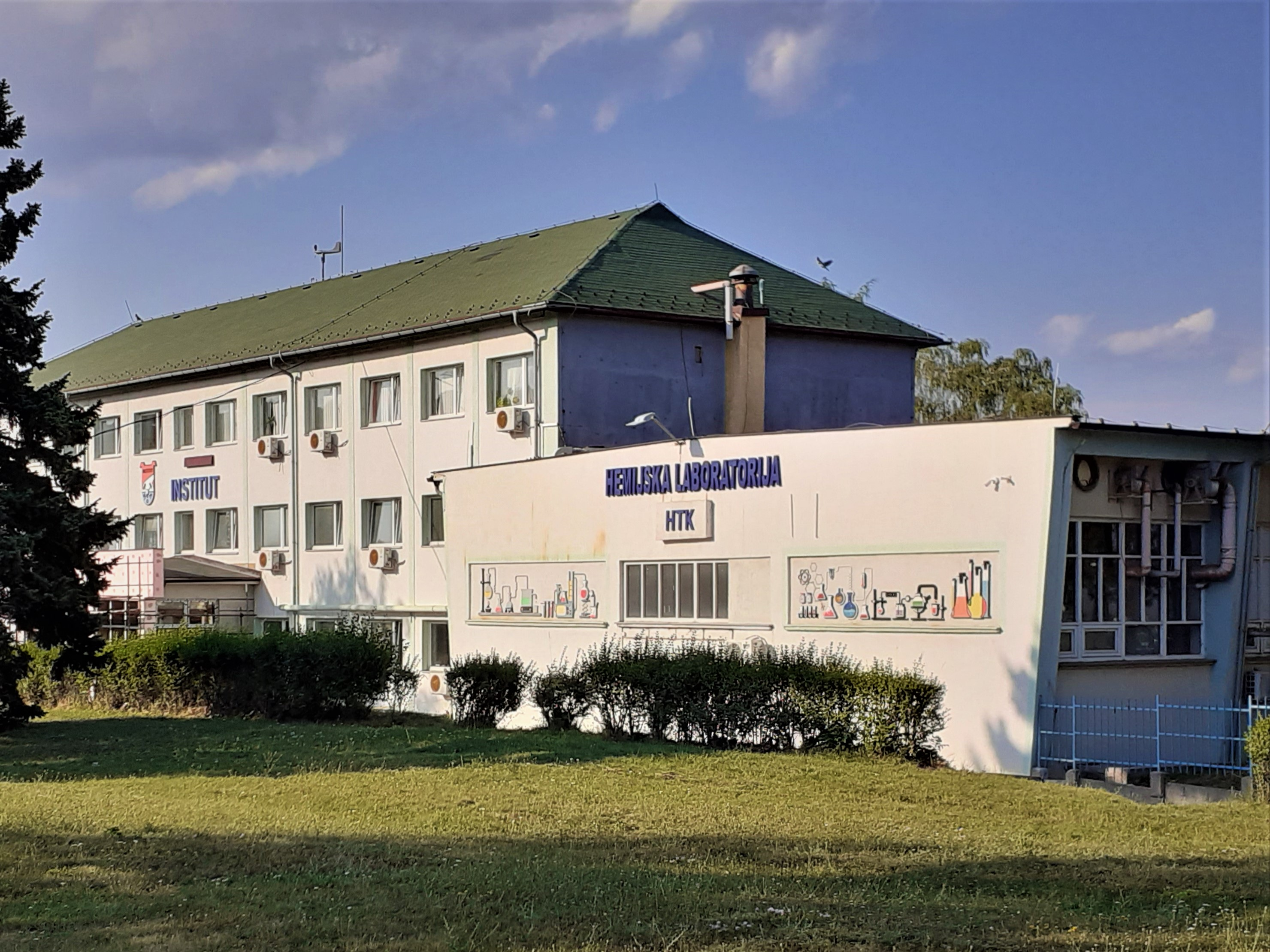
The Mining and Metallurgy Institute

Bor has a technical faculty of the University of Belgrade, which is the only faculty that is outside of the Belgrade. The Technical Faculty of Bor is a faculty of the University of Belgrade, with a tradition dating back to 1961. The Faculty was accredited as a scientific-research organisation in the area of technical-technological science in 2007. So far, 1,804 students graduated from this faculty, in addition to 18 students that completed specialist studies, 122 master studies, and 70 students that defended doctoral theses.

1. Technical faculty of Bor, University of Belgrade
2. Technical and mechanical engineering college Trstenik (department)

== Culture and society ==
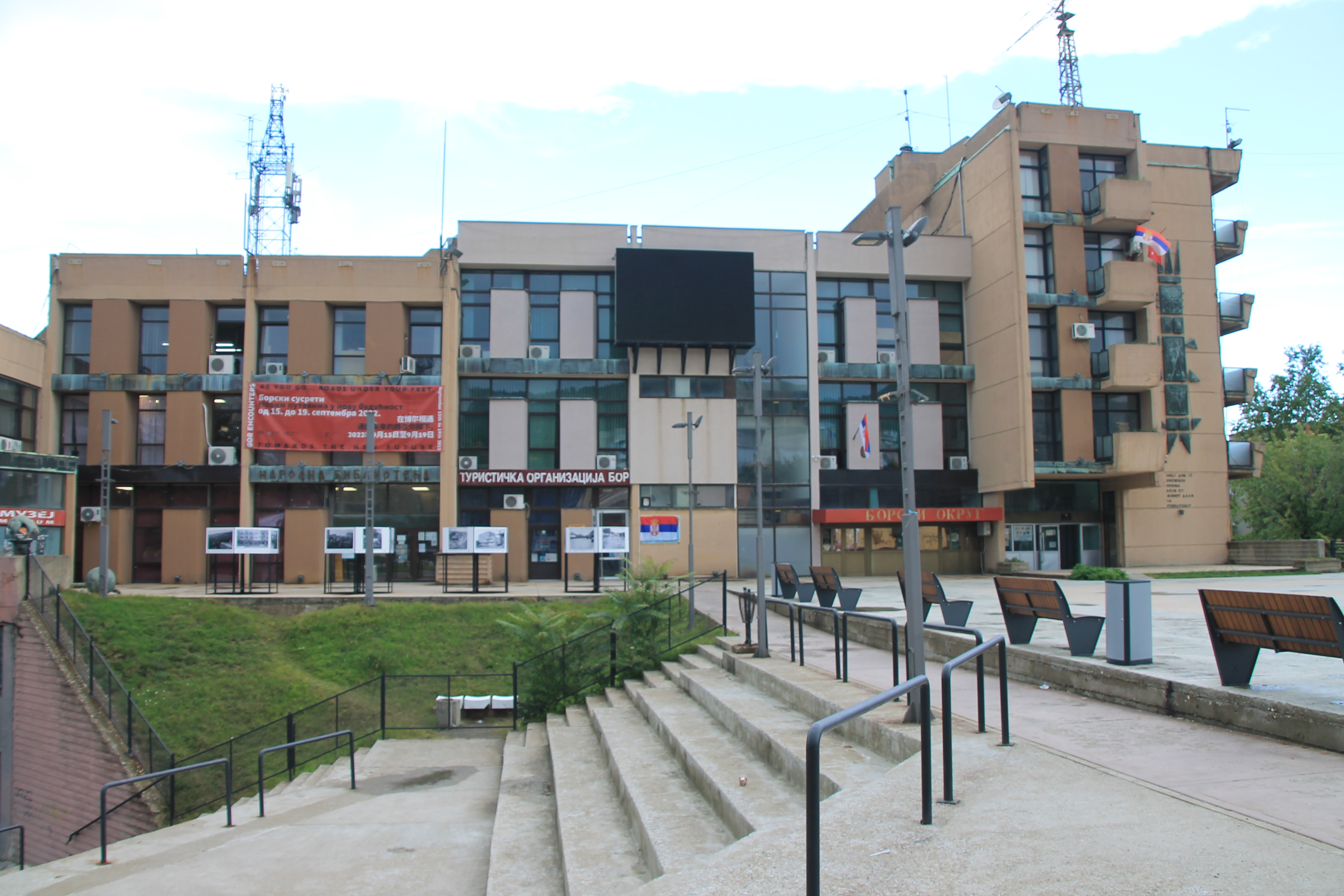
Cultural Center

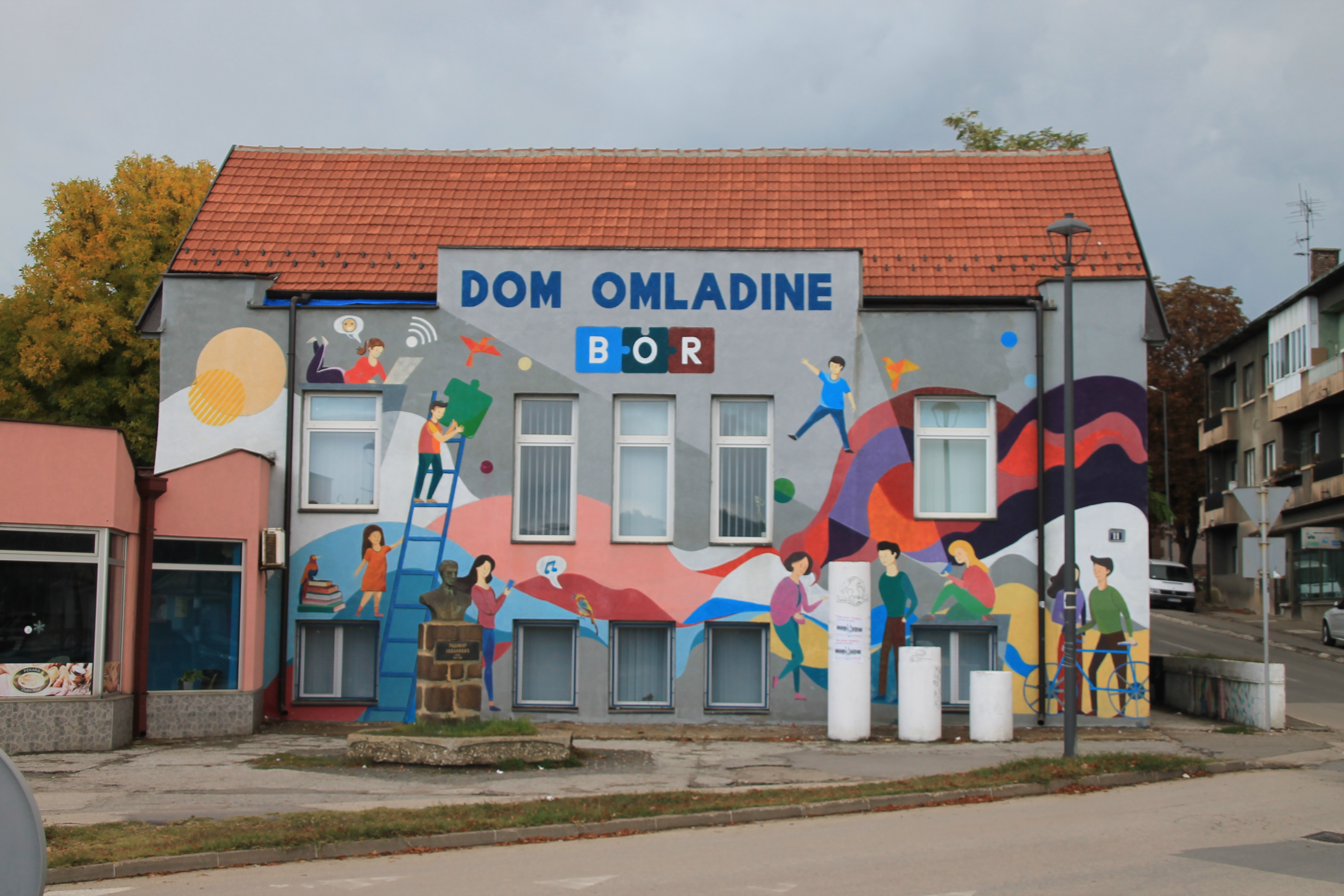
Bor Youth Center

=== Movies ===
Many films have been produced in Bor. Because of that, the city has the nickname "Boriwood". Serbian and international movies produced in Bor include Tears for Sale, Tilva Roš, White White World, Man Is Not a Bird, Winning of Freedom, On the Road to Katanga, Saga o tri nevina muškarca, Save Our Souls, Volja sinovljeva, and Vivegam.

=== Sports ===
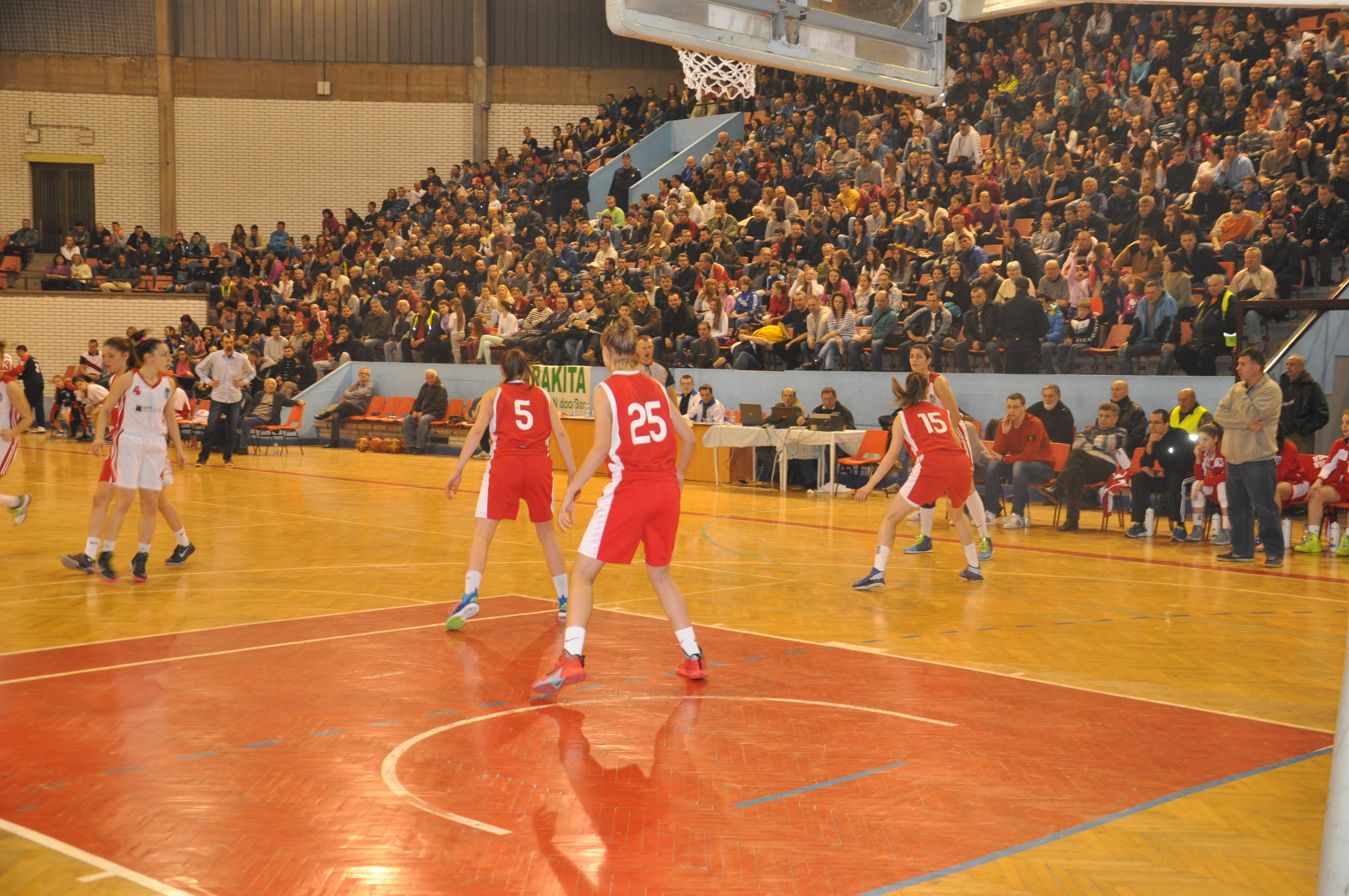
Bor Sports center during Bor-Red Star Belgrade, women basketball match in 2016

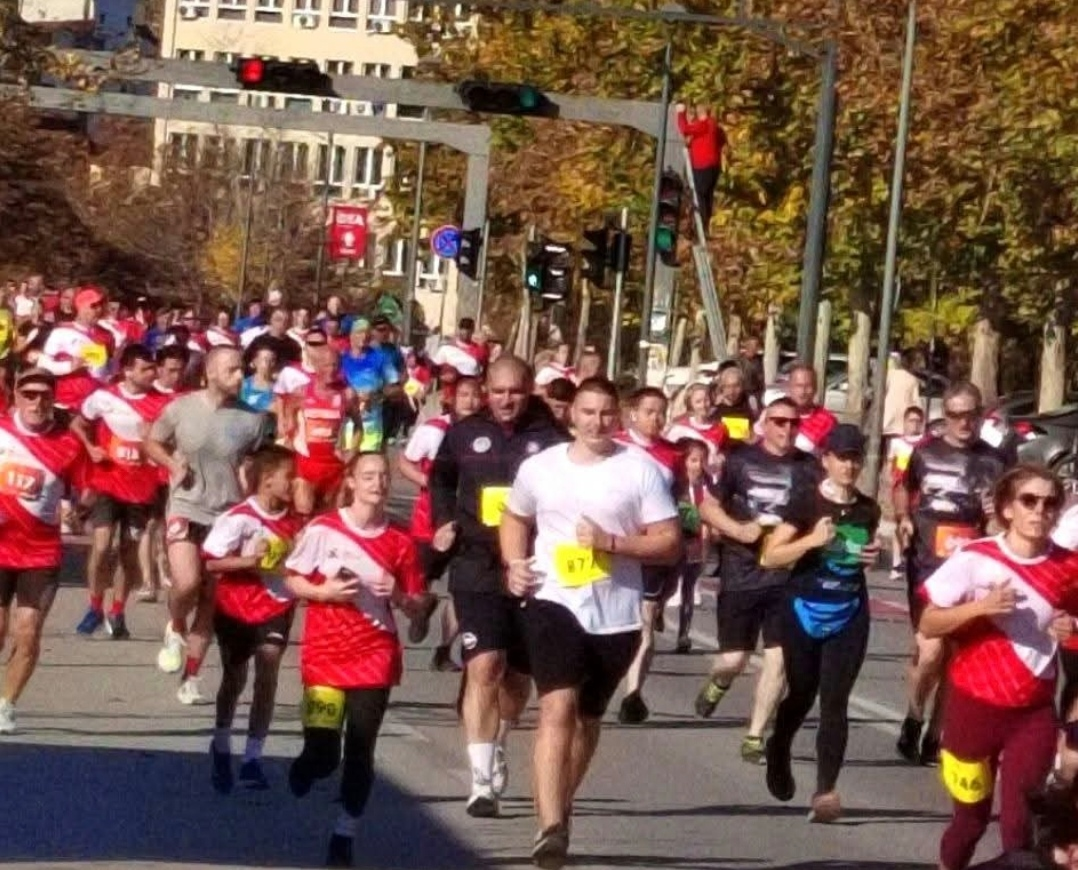
Bor International Marathon.jpg

Bor Sports Center (Serbian: Спортски центар Бор/Sportski centar Bor) is an indoor sporting arena. The capacity of the arena is 3,000 people in the seating area, and 4,500 in the ground level area. The Bor Skate Plaza is the first and the biggest skate park in the Balkans. It is opened in 2012. Next to the Bor Skate Plaza is the Karting circuit that was built in the same year.

One of the most famous clubs in the city is FK Bor football club, which spent several seasons in Yugoslavia's top division, the Yugoslav First League, participating in the European Cup Winners Cup in the season of 1968/69, and played in the national Cup Finale in season 1967/1968 against Crvena Zvezda.

FK Bor is currently part of Serbian League East, which is the Third tier league in Serbia, while another city club, FK Slatina Bor, is in Zone League East, the fourth-level football league in Serbia. ZKK Rudar is in Second Women's Basketball League of Serbia, ŽORK Bor in Serbian First League of Handball for Women, while American football team Golden Bears Bor is in the top-level American Football League of Serbia.

Under the auspices of the Public Utility "Sportski Centar Bor" is the Bor Airport, with a paved runway, where traditional sport air show "Fly in" used to be held.

Bor has hosted 2013 EBSA European Under-21 Snooker Championship.

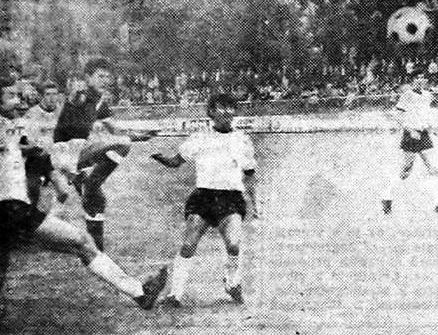
FK Bor in Yugoslav First League

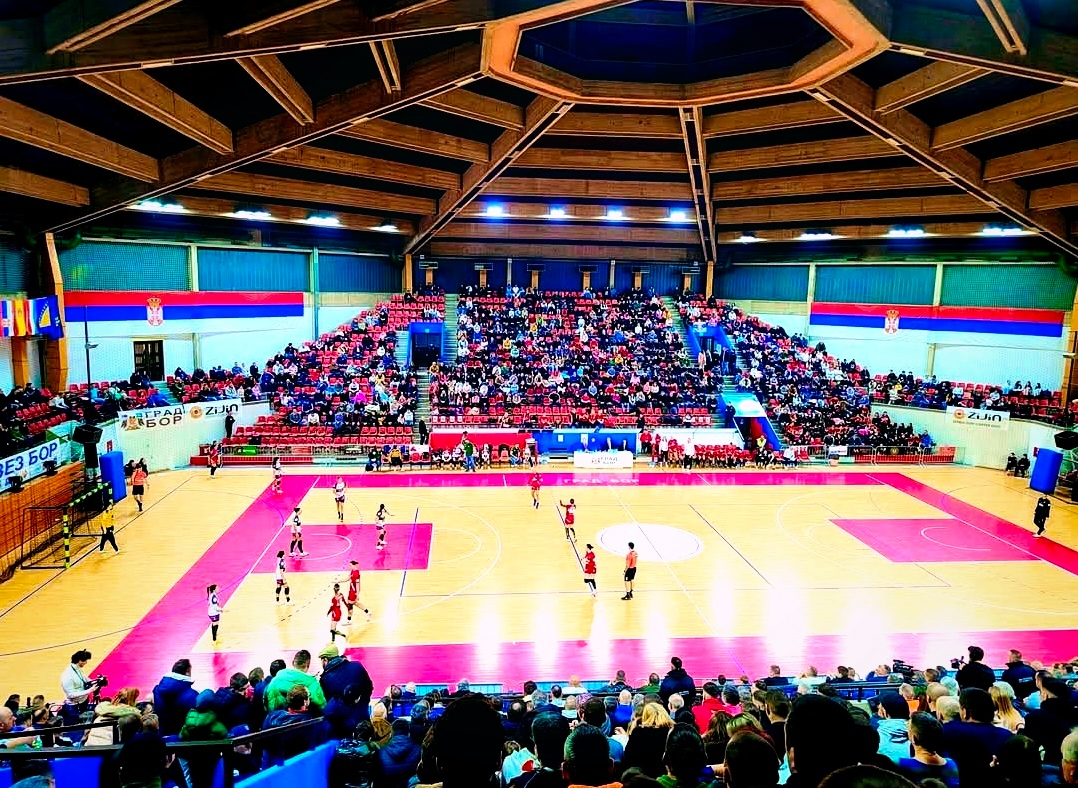
Bor-Malaga, EHF Cup 2025-2026

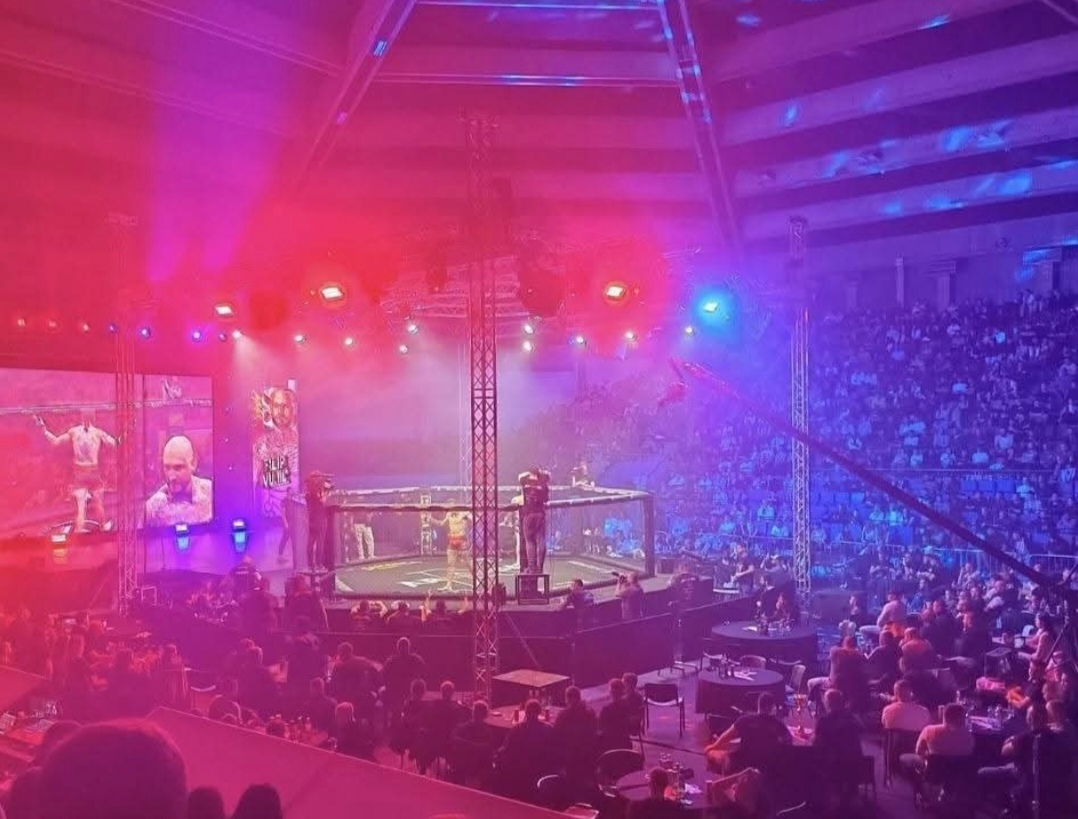
Armmada Bor

=== Tourism ===
The city of Bor has a number of tourist destinations:

Borsko jezero (Bor Lake) is a tourist attraction for domestic and foreign tourists, and it is less than 20 km away from the city center. It is popular in the summer, when the water temperature reaches 25 °C (77 °F) and it has two beaches. There is a bus line from the city center and back, during the summer.

Crni Vrh is a mountain 30 km from the city center. Highest peak has an elevation of 1,043 m (3,422 ft) above sea level. It has several ski tracks anda ski lift. The main ski track is 1,100 m long and has height span of 260 m. Just 16 km from the city center there is another mountain Stol. Its highest peak has an elevation of 1,156 meters above sea level. Like nearby Veliki Krš and Mali Krš, Stol has a number of pronounced karst formations. It is also a destination for mountaineering. It has a ski lift and ski trails. Mountain Rtanj in Boljevac municipality is 50 km away from Bor.

The Lazareva Pećina, which translates to Lazar's Cave, is the longest explored cave in Serbia. It is located 21 km from the city center. According to 2012's Recent Landform Evolution: The Carpatho-Balkan-Dinaric Region, the cave is 9,407 metres (5.845 mi) long. The cave is situated near the entrance of the deep canyon carved into the mountains by the river Zlotska. Bogovina cave is also near Bor, just about 30 km away.

Lazar's Canyon is located at about 10 kilometers from Bor. This is the deepest and longest canyon in eastern Serbia. Because of its steep rocky cliffs, the canyon has not yet been fully explored.

Brestovac Spa is one of oldest spas in Serbia, located just 8 km from the city center. Health treatment are done with slightly sulphurous and oligomineral water with temperature of 20 to 41 °C. The Spa is for treatment and curing diseases and injuries to the muscles and bones. Especially relevant cured diseases are degenerative rheumatic diseases, rheumatoid and psoriatic arthritis, swelling and pain. And also chronic joint diseases, muscle disorders lumbago – lower back pain. More gynecological diseases, upper respiratory mucous membrane inflammation, skin conditions, increased diuresis, low level of stomach acid, digestive tract diseases. Furthermore, kidney diseases and nerve diseases. Water is rich with potassium, calcium, sodium, magnesium, chlorine, iodine, sulfate and also carbonate. Ways of treatment are drinking and bathing.

The Residence of Prince Miloš (Serbian: Конак кнеза Милоша/Konak kneza Miloša) is a royal residence in the Brestovac Spa.

Bor zoo (Serbian: Борски зоолошки врт), is a zoo located in Bor, Serbia. It was founded in 2011, and it is one of four zoos in Serbia and is also considered to be one of the most attractive public zoos in southeastern Europe. The zoo covers an area of 2.5 hectares (6.17 acres) and holds about 140 animals representing more than 70 different wild and exotic species of animals as well as domestic and indigenous ones.

Park Museum is an "open museum" located from the city center, and through the main streets "Mose Pijade" and "Zeleni bulevar" with mining exhibits. It is possible to see them from a vehicle or from a sidewalk.

Paragliding is popular in this part of Serbia, and there are several locations used for this sport near Bor, such as mountains Crni Vrh and Stol.

Tourist attractions

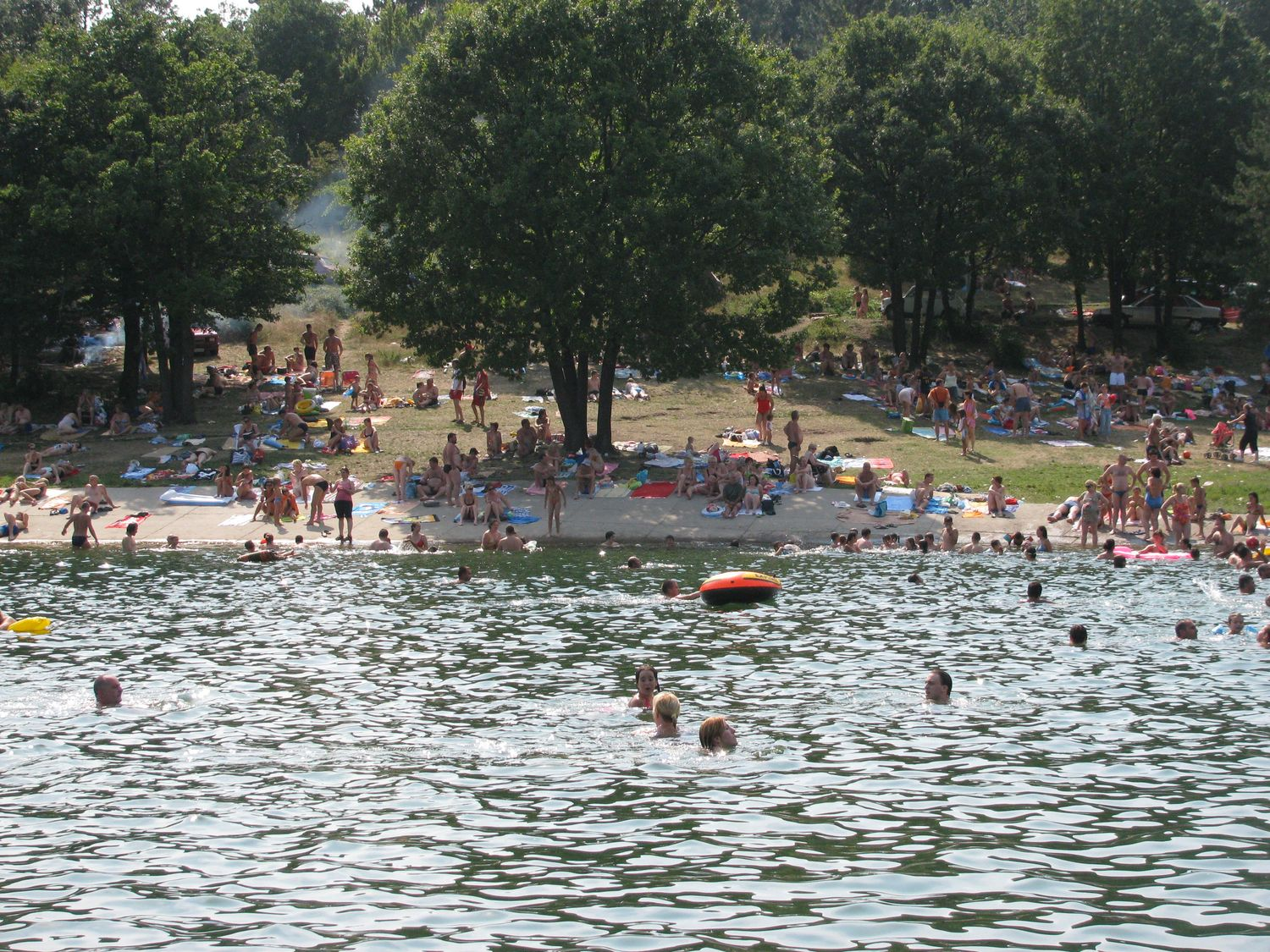
Borsko jezero (Bor Lake)

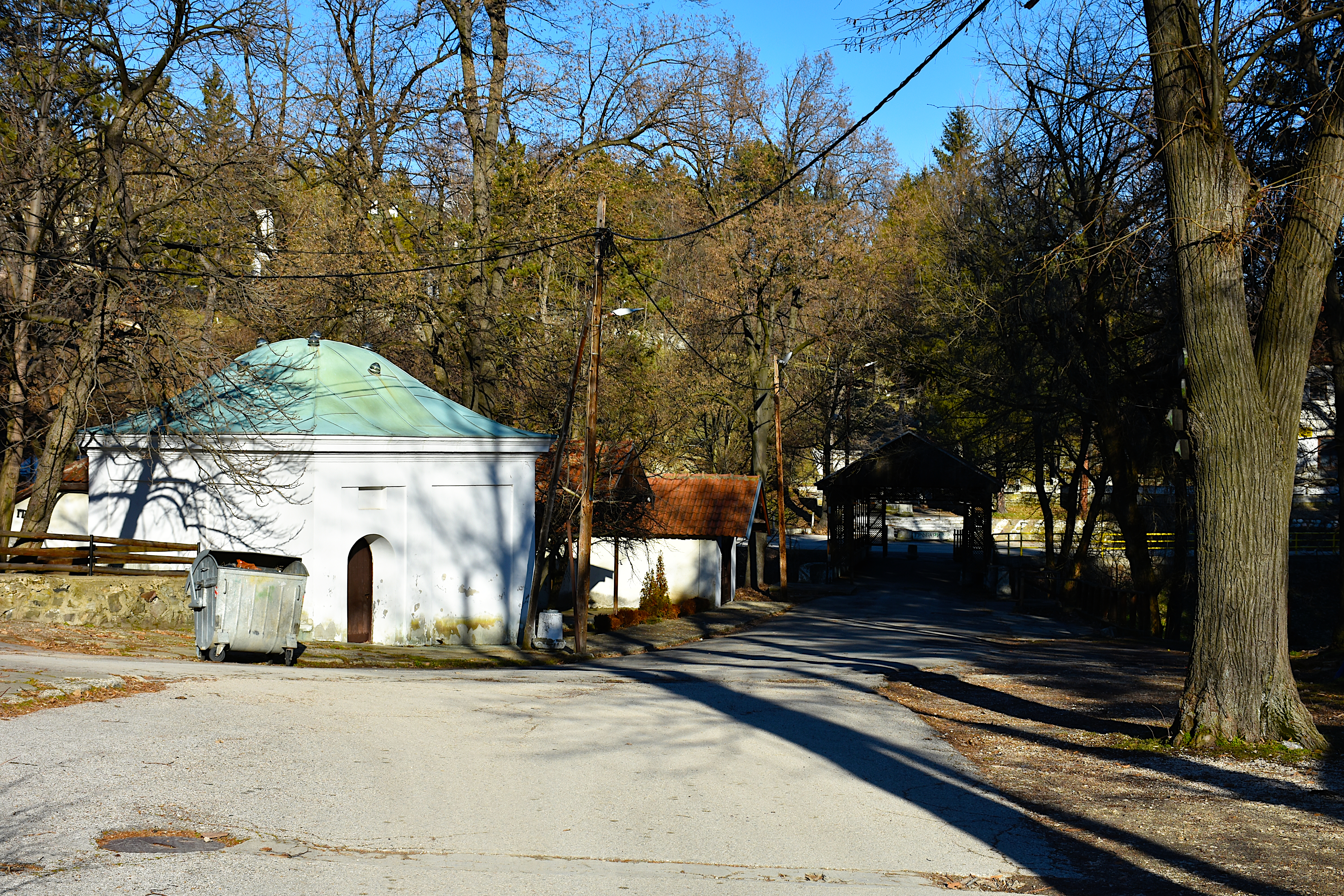
Turkish Hammam

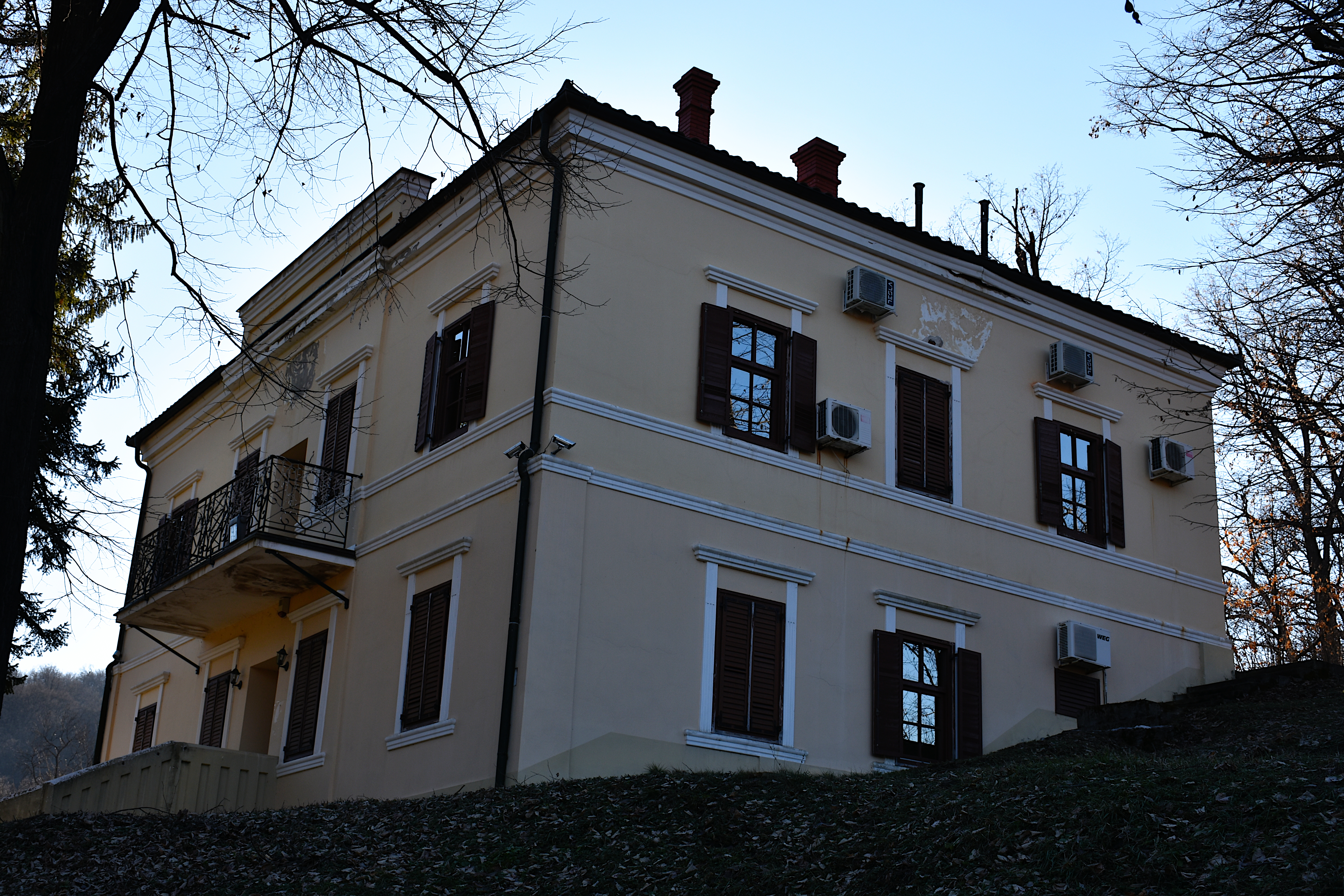
Prince Alexandar Castle

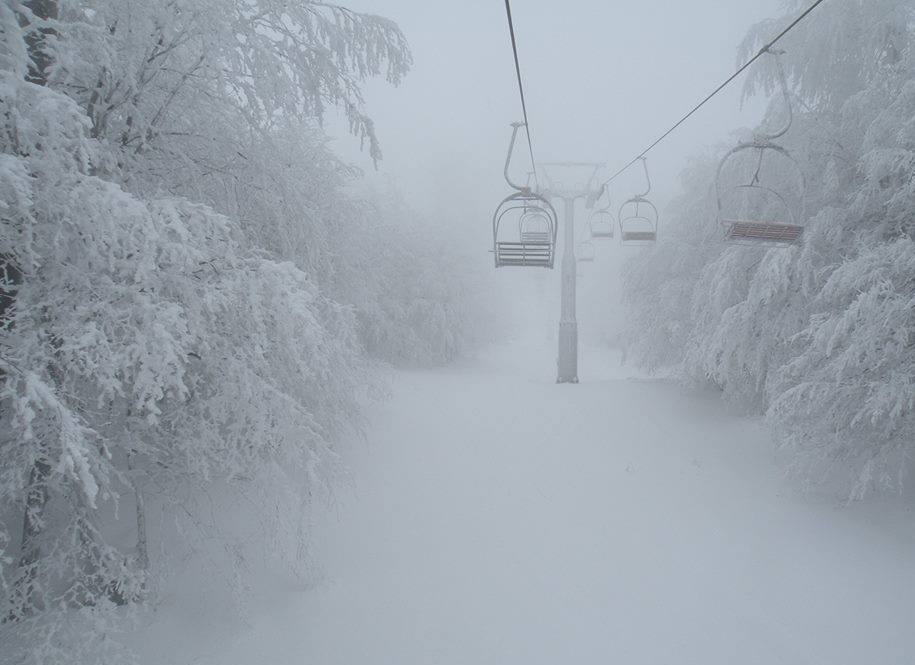
Crni Vrh

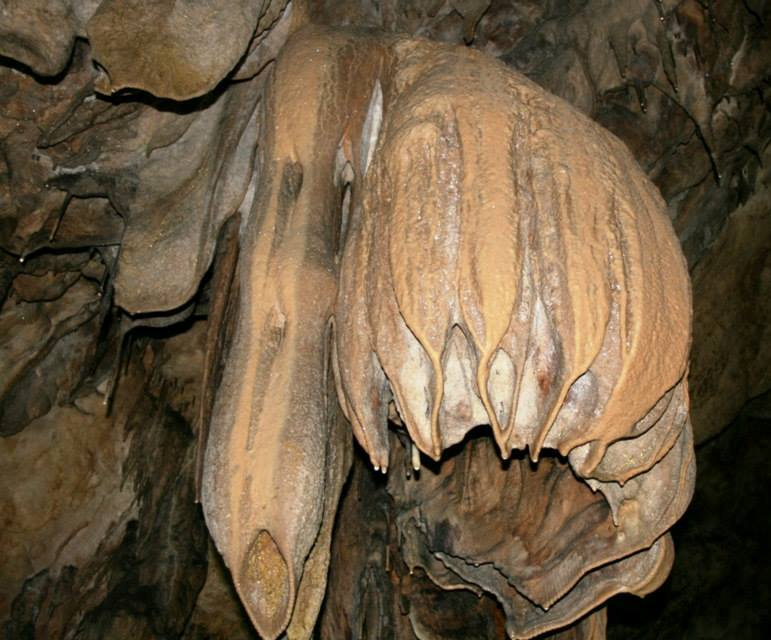
Lazar's cave

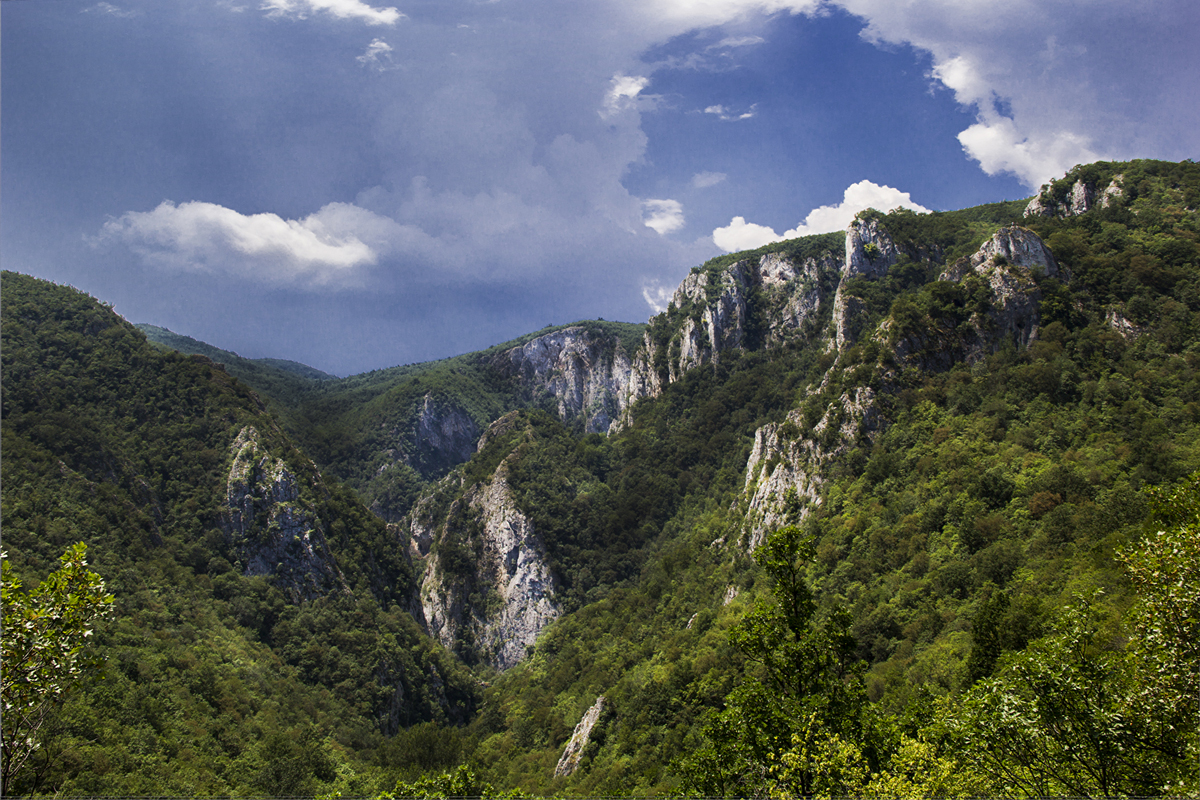
Lazar's Canyon

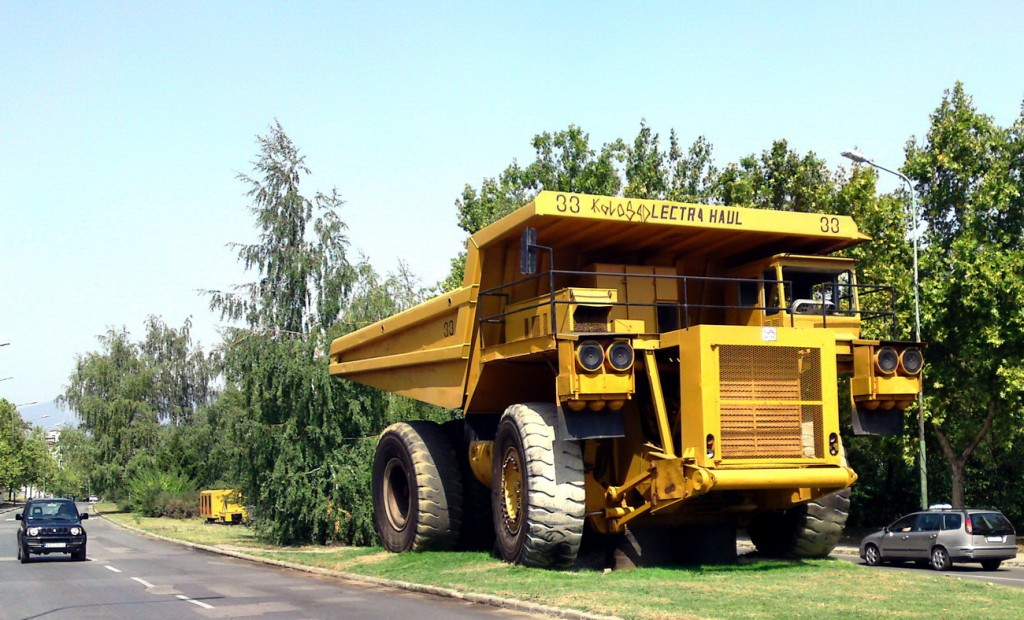
Park Museum

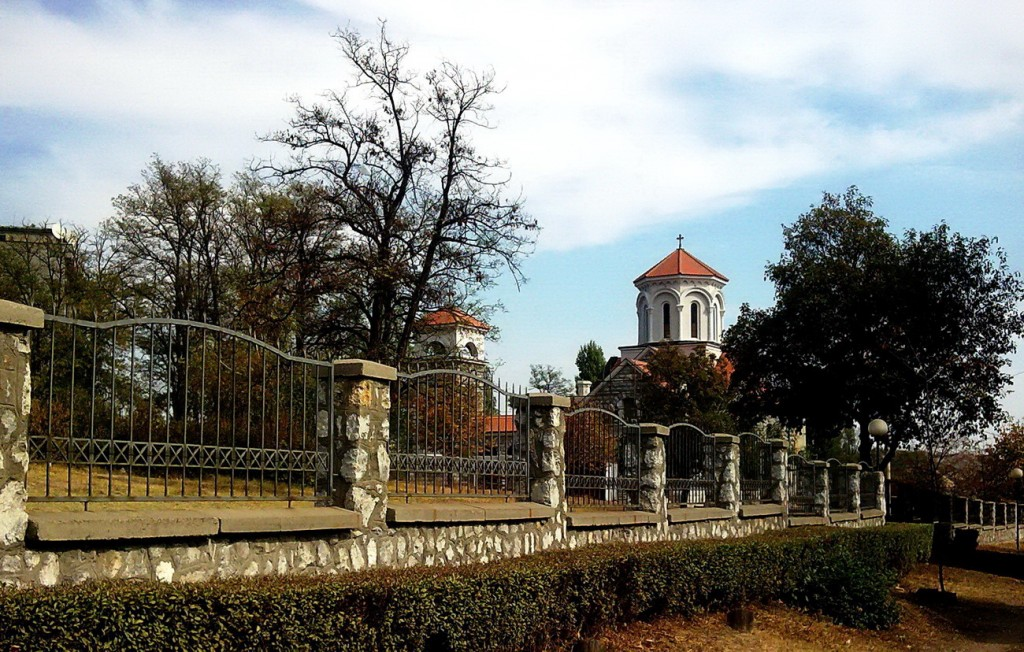
St. George Orthodox Church

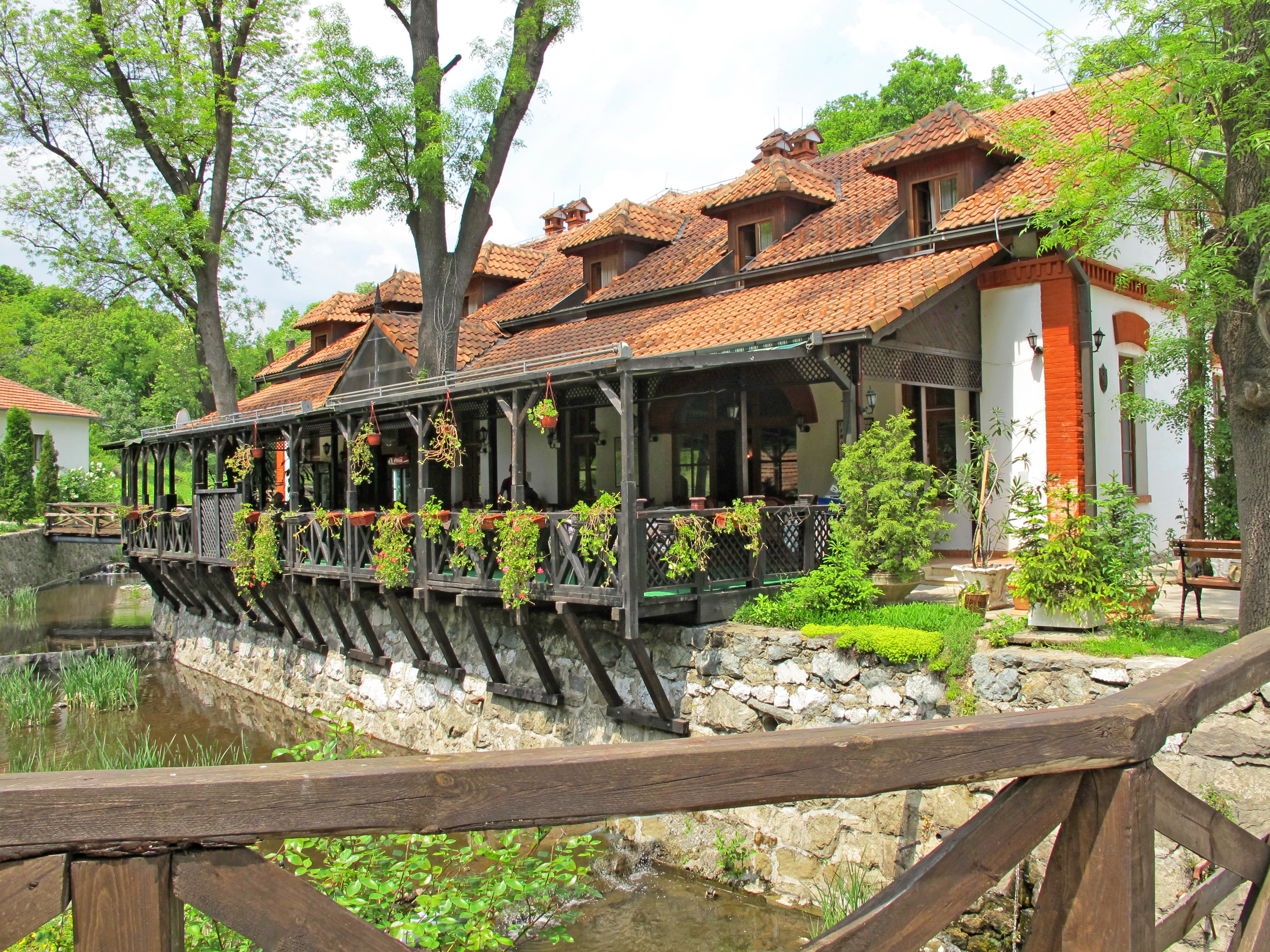
Brestovac Spa

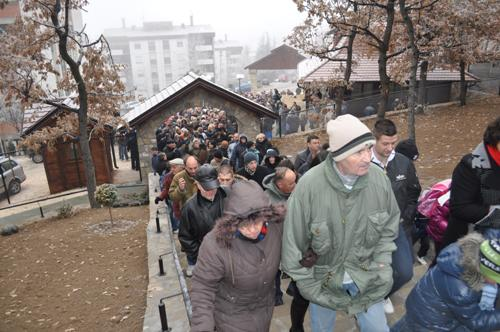
ZOO Bor

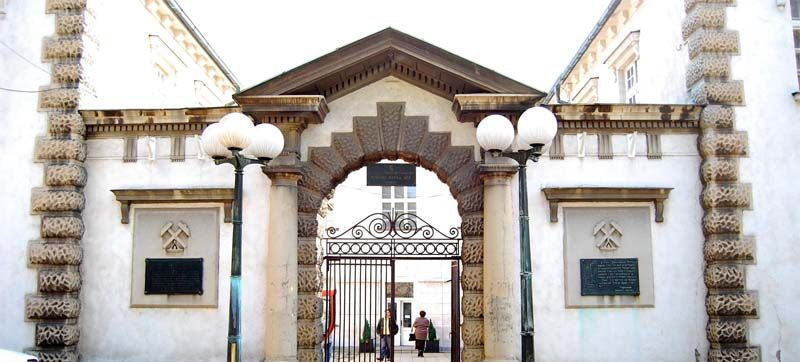
French architecture

== Politics ==
Elections 2022

In the municipality of Bor, there were 40,661 eligible citizens that were able to vote in the local election. The local City Election Commission stated that the turnout was 61.2%. The Serbian Progressive Party won 15 seats, while the coalition led by the People's Party won 6 seats. The Socialist Party of Serbia and Vlach Party "Bridge" both won four seats, while the coalition led by the Party of Freedom and Justice won three seats. The Dveri–POKS coalition, Fighters for Bor, and Loud for the Youth each won one seat.

Elections 2026

Coalition SNS-SPS-SRS-SNP won 19 seats, while the list "Bor, our responsibility" won 15 seats and VNS one seat. On the list "Bor, our responsibility" there were some local politicians, movements and organizations supported by Serbian Student Movement. They won at 16 places, most of urban polling stations in Bor. However, coalition between Serbian Progressive Party, Socialist Party of Serbia, Serbian Radical Party and Serbian People's Party secured much better results in rural parts of the city and in villages, which make a difference in final results. During the elections, multiple obstructions and physical attacks on journalists, students, lawyers were documented.. Because of that many European movements and political parties criticized the election process. European Democratic Party pointed out that "When violence protects power, elections are no longer free"

Party	Votes	%	Seats
SNS–SPS–SRS–SNP	12,516	49.04	19
Bor, our responsibility	10,331	40.48	15
VNS	1,025	4.02	1
Irena Živković - BB	600	2.35	0
People at the center	423	1.66	0
NDSS–Monarchists	357	1.40	0
Fighters for Bor	271	1.06	0
Total	25,523	100.00	35
Valid votes	25,523	98.24	
Invalid/blank votes	458	1.76	
Total votes	25,981	100.00	
Registered voters/turnout	38,492	67.55	
Source: GIK Bor

== Local media ==
Newspapers

- Timočke "Тимочке"
- Borski problem (Weekly magazine)
- Kolektiv "Лист Колектив"

Social media and Internet media

- Solaris media (in Serbian)
- Ist media (in Serbian)
- Bor Info (in Serbian)
- Bor 030 (in Serbian)
- Medija centar (in Serbian)

Radio stations

- Klik FM (99.5)
- Radio Antena (101.6)
- Radio Bor (103.1)

TV stations

- Radio television Bor

== Notable people ==
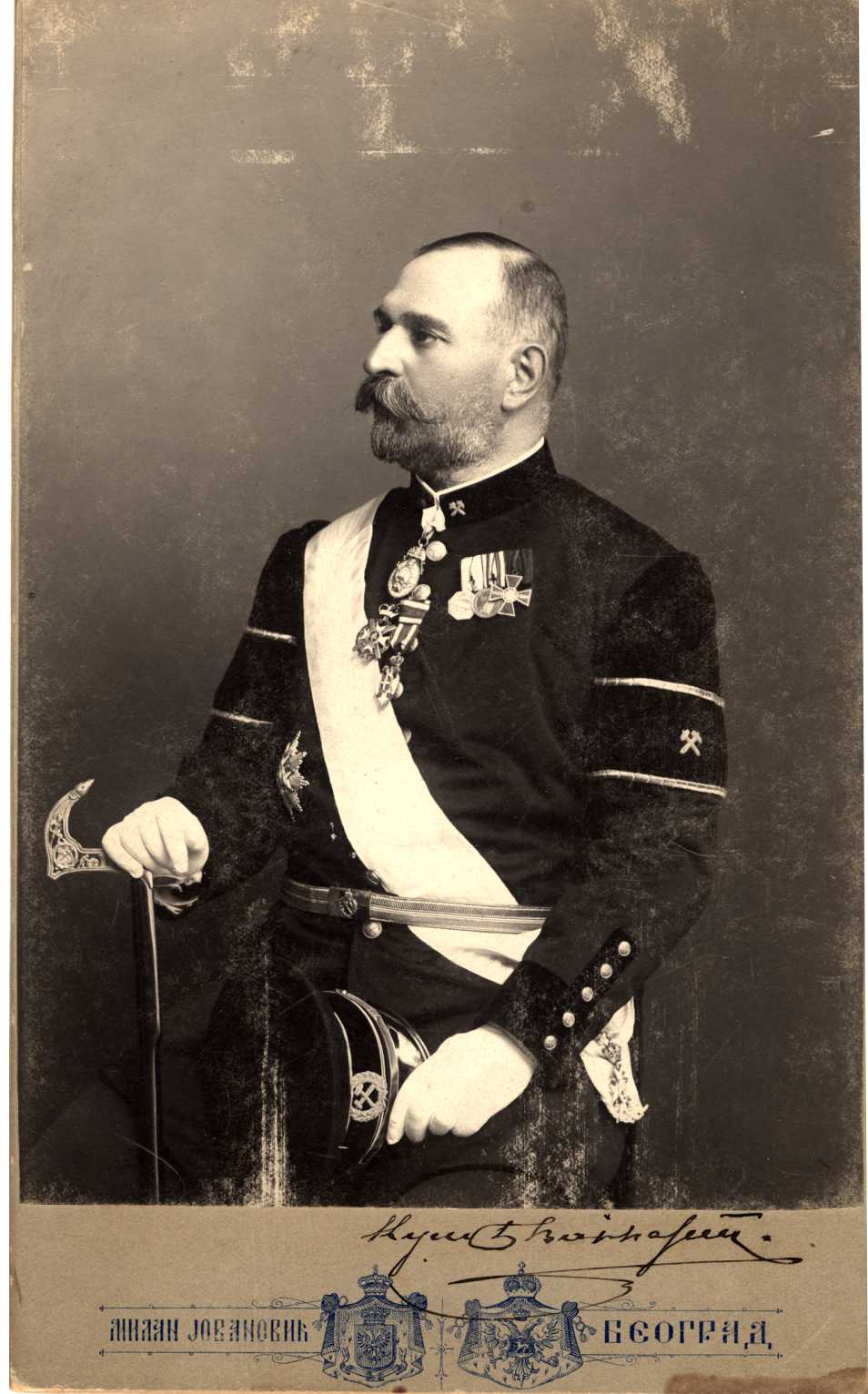
Đorđe Vajfert

- Vane Bor (1908–1993) surrealist artist.
- Aleksandar Miljković, footballer
- Đorđe Vajfert (1850–1937), first owner of mines and donator of Saint George's Church.
- Samu Borovszky (1860–1912), historian and editor-in-chief of works on the counties of the Kingdom of Hungary; his surname can be translated as The Boronnese (people from Bor).
- Tanja Ćirov (1981–), was a Bulgarian - Serbian female professional basketball player, former Bulgarian national team player.
- Nikola Ležaić (1981–), Serbian film director/screenwriter/film producer.
- Boriša Đorđević (1953–), Serbian retired football player, winner of European Cup with Hamburger SV in 1982–1983 season, Bundesliga champion two times, and Yugoslav champion with Hajduk Split. Former national team player of Yugoslavia.
- Ivan Gvozdenović (1978–), Serbian retired football defender who currently works as a manager.
- Branislav Mihajlović (1953–), member of the National Assembly of Serbia, and leader of "Enough is enough" association.
- Nikola Šainović (1948–), Prime Minister of Serbia from 1993 to 1994 and the minister of Energy and Mining of Serbia and the Deputy Prime Minister of Serbia from 1991 to 1993.
- Bobana Veličković (1990–2020), Serbian female sport shooter, competed at Summer Olympics in 2012 and 2016.
- Teya Dora (1992-), the singer of "Džanum", a song that became very popular worldwide due to the social platform TikTok, was born in Bor.

== Twin towns and sister cities ==
Bor is twinned with:

- Bar, Montenegro
- Le Creusot, France
- Khmelnytskyi, Ukraine
- Kitwe, Zambia
- Kriva Palanka, North Macedonia
- Shanghang County, China
- Vulcan, Romania
- Vratsa, Bulgaria

== See also ==
- Bor Airport
- FK Bor
- RTB Bor
- List of places in Serbia

== Sources ==
- "Бор". Гласник Етнографског музеја, књ. 38. 1975.
