= Paralovo =

Paralovo may refer to:

- Paralovo (Bosilegrad), a village in Serbia
- Paralovo (Novi Pazar), a village in Serbia
