= Resen =

Resen is the name of several places:

- Resen Municipality, a municipality in North Macedonia
- Resen, North Macedonia, a town within the municipality
- Resen (Bosilegrad), a village in Serbia
- Resen (Bible), a city founded by Ashur according to Genesis 10
- Resen (crater), Martian impact crater
- Resen, Veliko Tarnovo Province, Bulgaria
- Sitaria, a village in Greece known in Macedonian as Resen
