= Donja Lisina =

- Village (Selo)
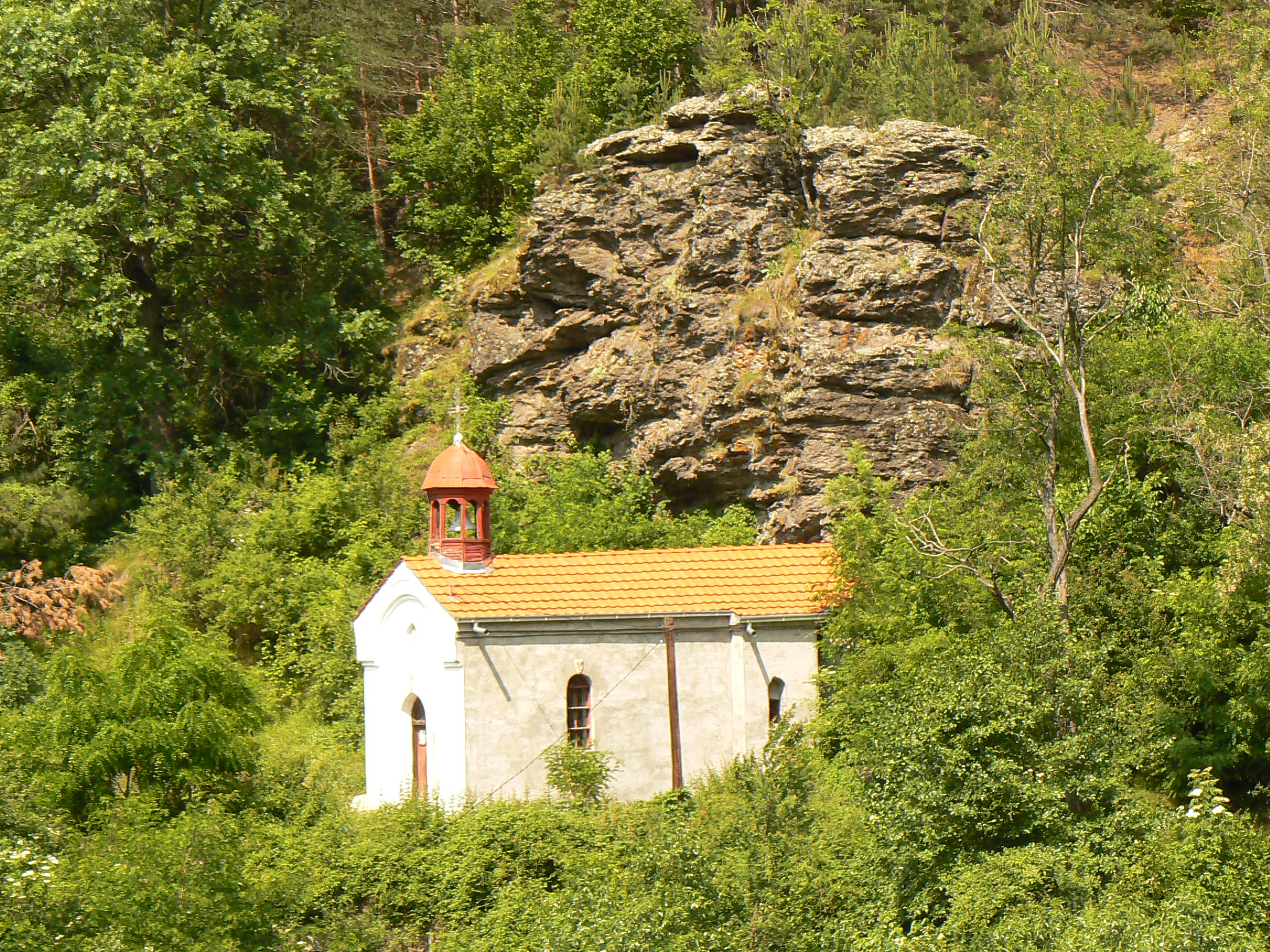
- Church in Donja Lisina

- Location within Serbia
- Coordinates: 42°32′N 22°24′E
- Country: Serbia
- District: Pčinja District
- Municipality: Bosilegrad

Population (2002)
  - Total: 316
- Time zone: UTC+1 (CET)
  - Summer (DST): UTC+2 (CEST)

Donja Lisina (Serbian Cyrillic: Доња Лисина) is a village in the municipality of Bosilegrad, Serbia. According to the 2002 census, the town has a population of 316 people.
