= Doganica =

Doganica Доганица
- Village (Selo)
- Location within Serbia
- Country: Serbia
- Region: Southern and Eastern Serbia
- District: Pčinja
- Municipality: Bosilegrad

Population (2002)
  - Total: 50
- Time zone: UTC+1 (CET)
  - Summer (DST): UTC+2 (CEST)

Doganica (Serbian Cyrillic: Доганица) is a village in the municipality of Bosilegrad, Serbia. According to the 2002 census, the town has a population of 50 people.
