= Gornja Lisina =

Gornja Lisina Горња Лисина
- Village (Selo)
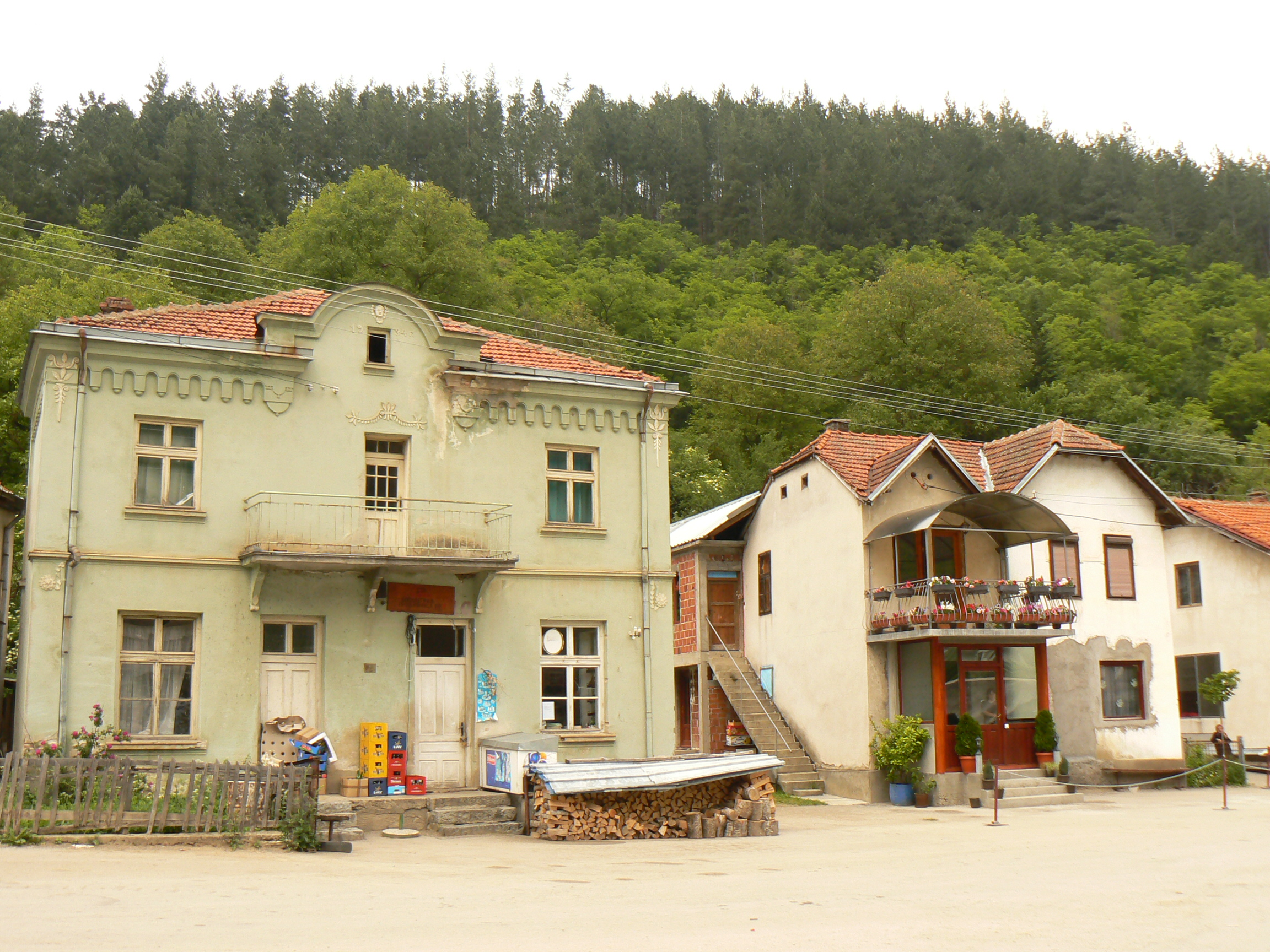

- Location within Serbia
- Country: Serbia
- Region: Southern and Eastern Serbia
- District: Pčinja
- Municipality: Bosilegrad

Population (2002)
  - Total: 474
- Time zone: UTC+1 (CET)
  - Summer (DST): UTC+2 (CEST)

Gornja Lisina (Serbian Cyrillic: Горња Лисина) is a village in the municipality of Bosilegrad, Serbia. According to the 2002 census, the town has a population of 474 people.
