= Donja Ljubata =

Donja Ljubata Доња Љубата
- Village (Selo)
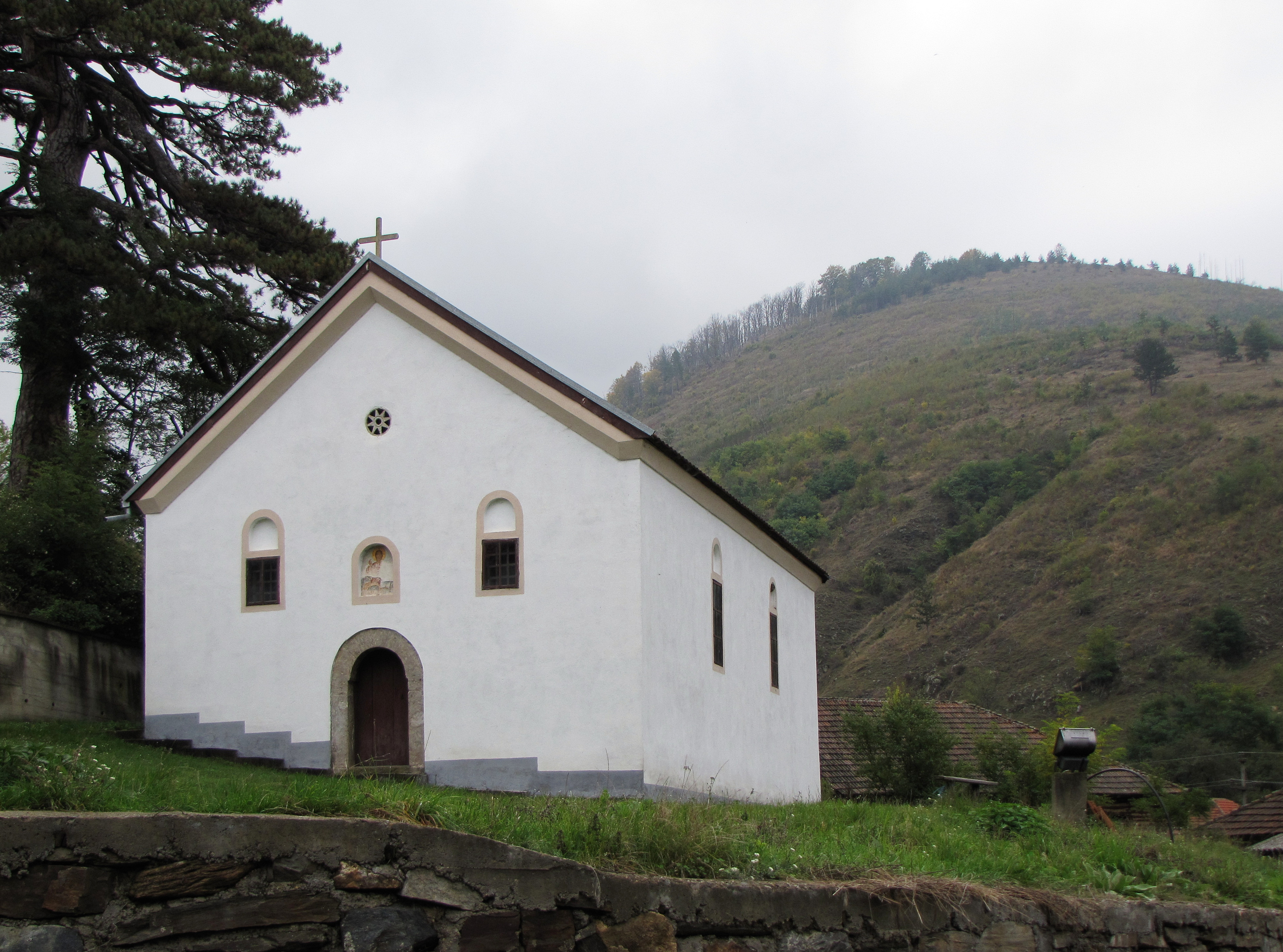
- Church in Donja Ljubata

- Location within Serbia
- Country: Serbia
- Region: Southern and Eastern Serbia
- District: Pčinja
- Municipality: Bosilegrad

Population (2002)
  - Total: 395
- Time zone: UTC+1 (CET)
  - Summer (DST): UTC+2 (CEST)

Donja Ljubata (Serbian Cyrillic: Доња Љубата) is a village in the municipality of Bosilegrad, Serbia. According to the 2002 census, the town had a population of 395 people.
