= Gložje =

Gložje Гложје
- Village (Selo)
- Location within Serbia
- Country: Serbia
- Region: Southern and Eastern Serbia
- District: Pčinja
- Municipality: Bosilegrad

Population (2002)
  - Total: 327
- Time zone: UTC+1 (CET)
  - Summer (DST): UTC+2 (CEST)

Gložje (Serbian Cyrillic: Гложје) is a village in the municipality of Bosilegrad, Serbia.
