= Buceljevo =

Buceljevo Буцељево
- Village (Selo)
- Location within Serbia
- Country: Serbia
- Region: Southern and Eastern Serbia
- District: Pčinja
- Municipality: Bosilegrad

Population (2002)
  - Total: 22
- Time zone: UTC+1 (CET)
  - Summer (DST): UTC+2 (CEST)

Buceljevo (Serbian Cyrillic: Буцељево) is a village in the municipality of Bosilegrad, Serbia. According to the 2002 census, the town has a population of 22 people.
