= Rikačevo =

Rikačevo Рикачево
- Village (Selo)
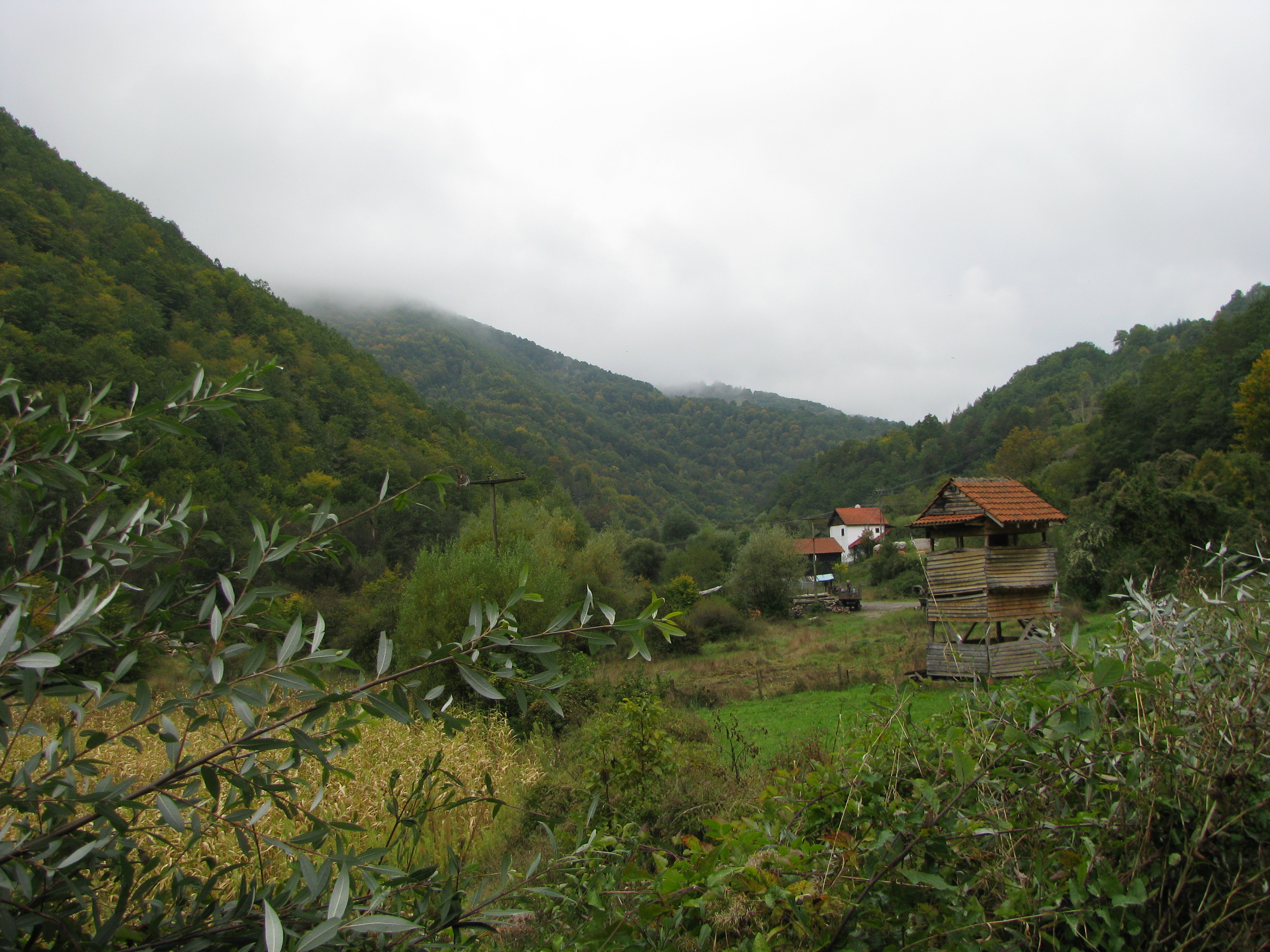

- Location within Serbia
- Coordinates: 42°23′N 22°26′E
- Country: Serbia
- Region: Southern and Eastern Serbia
- District: Pčinja
- Municipality: Bosilegrad

Population (2002)
  - Total: 109
- Time zone: UTC+1 (CET)
  - Summer (DST): UTC+2 (CEST)

Rikačevo (Serbian Cyrillic: Рикачево) is a village in the municipality of Bosilegrad, Serbia. According to the 2002 census, the town has a population of 109 people.

The village is located near the Bulgarian border and is part of the Pčinja District, known for its mountainous terrain and mixed ethnic population.

Rikačevo’s population declined from 144 in the 1991 census to 109 in 2002 and further to 87 in 2011, reflecting a broader trend of depopulation in small rural settlements in the Pčinja District.
