= Brankovci =

Brankovci Бранковци
- Village (Selo)
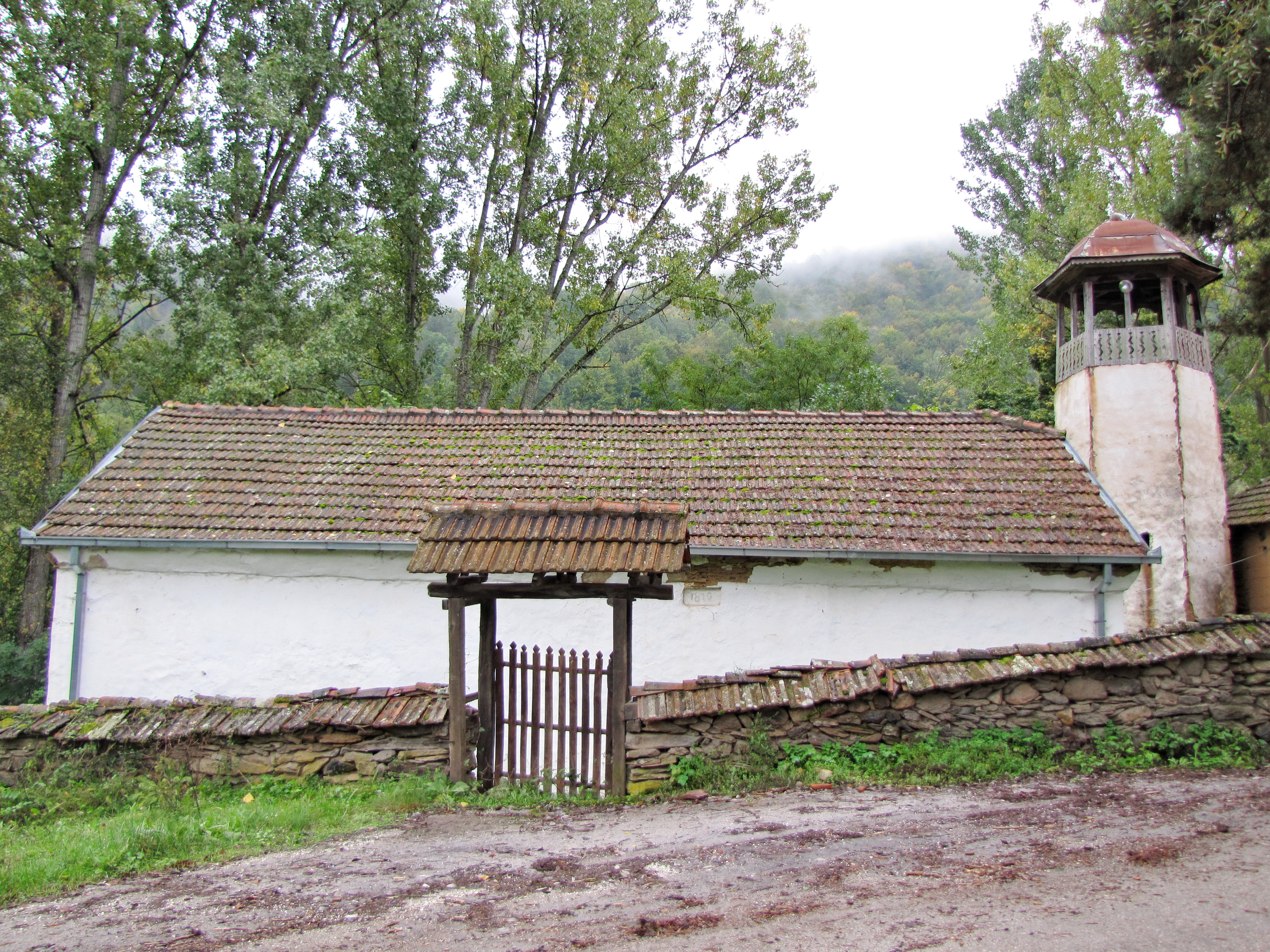
- Orthodox church in Brankovci

- Location within Serbia
- Coordinates: 42°25′N 22°30′E
- Country: Serbia
- Region: Southern and Eastern Serbia
- District: Pčinja
- Municipality: Bosilegrad

Population (2002)
  - Total: 116
- Time zone: UTC+1 (CET)
  - Summer (DST): UTC+2 (CEST)

Brankovci (Serbian Cyrillic: Бранковци) is a village in the municipality of Bosilegrad, Serbia. According to the 2002 census, the town has a population of 116 people.
