= Mlekominci =

Mlekominci Млекоминци
- Village (Selo)
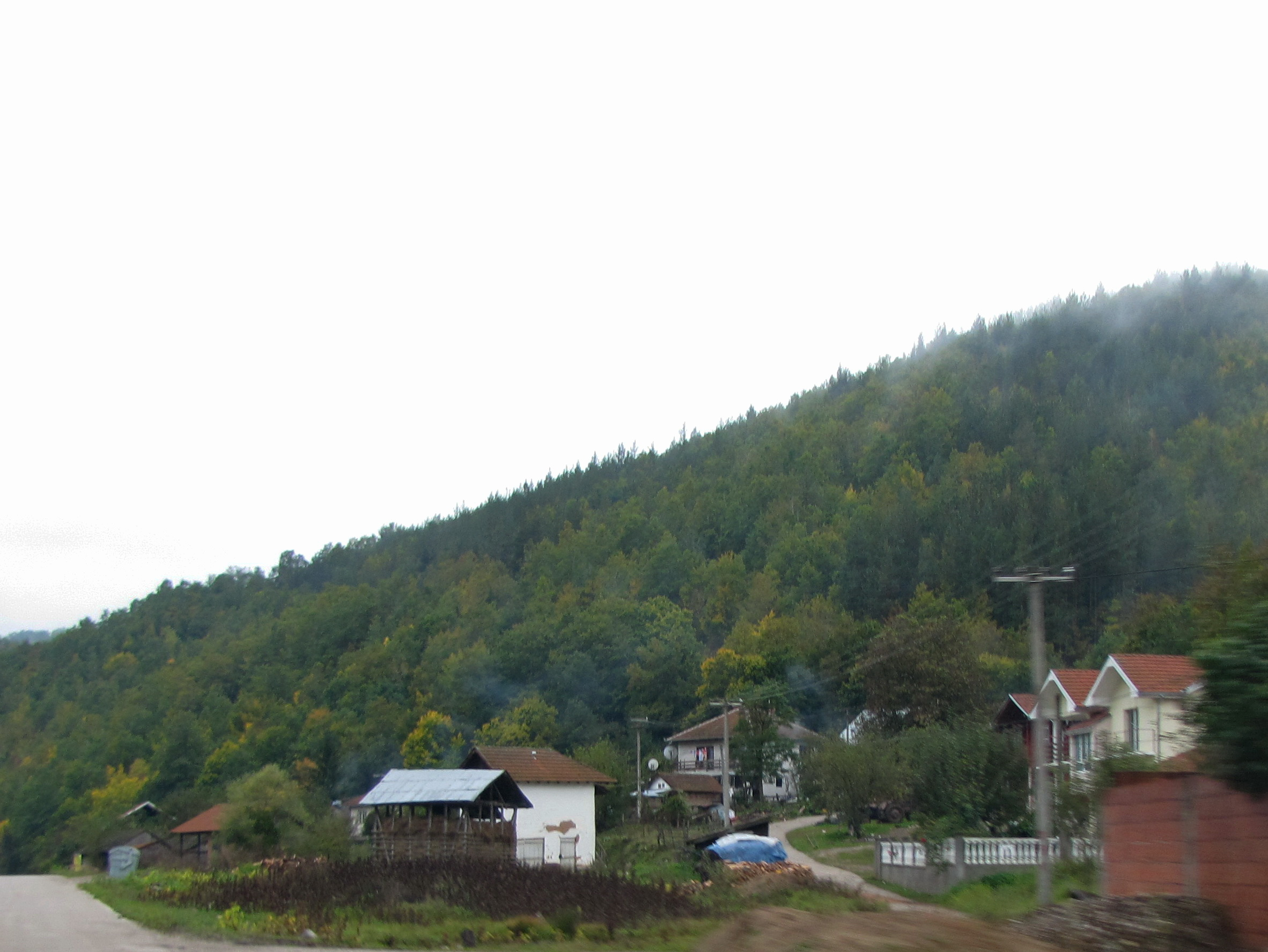

- Location within Serbia
- Country: Serbia
- Region: Southern and Eastern Serbia
- District: Pčinja
- Municipality: Bosilegrad

Population (2002)
  - Total: 124
- Time zone: UTC+1 (CET)
  - Summer (DST): UTC+2 (CEST)

Mlekominci (Serbian Cyrillic: Млекоминци) is a village in the municipality of Bosilegrad, Serbia. According to the 2002 census, the town has a population of 124 people.
