= Bosilegrad =

Town and municipality in Pčinja District, Serbia

Bosilegrad Босилеград (Serbian) Босилеград (Bulgarian)
- Town and municipality
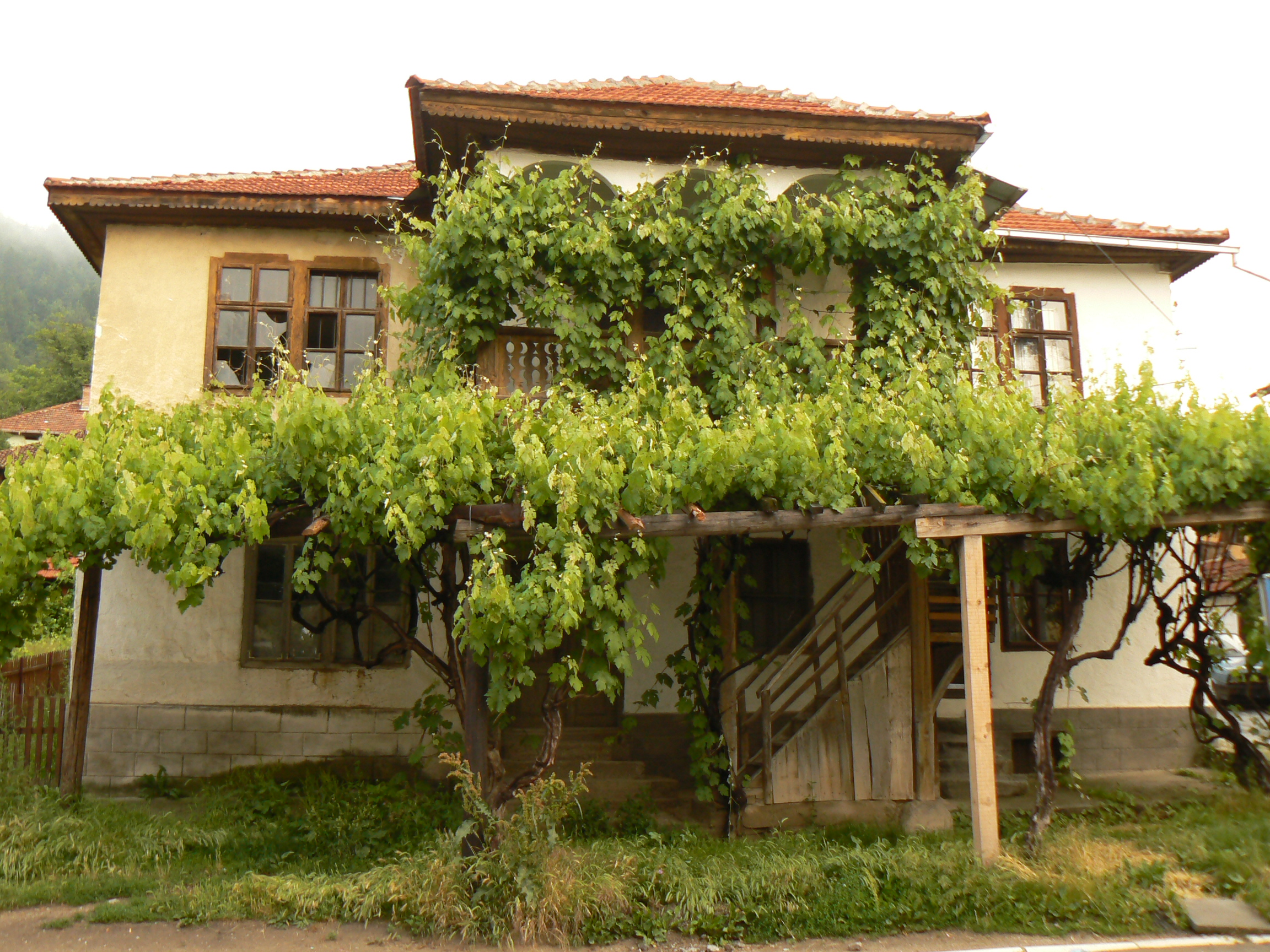
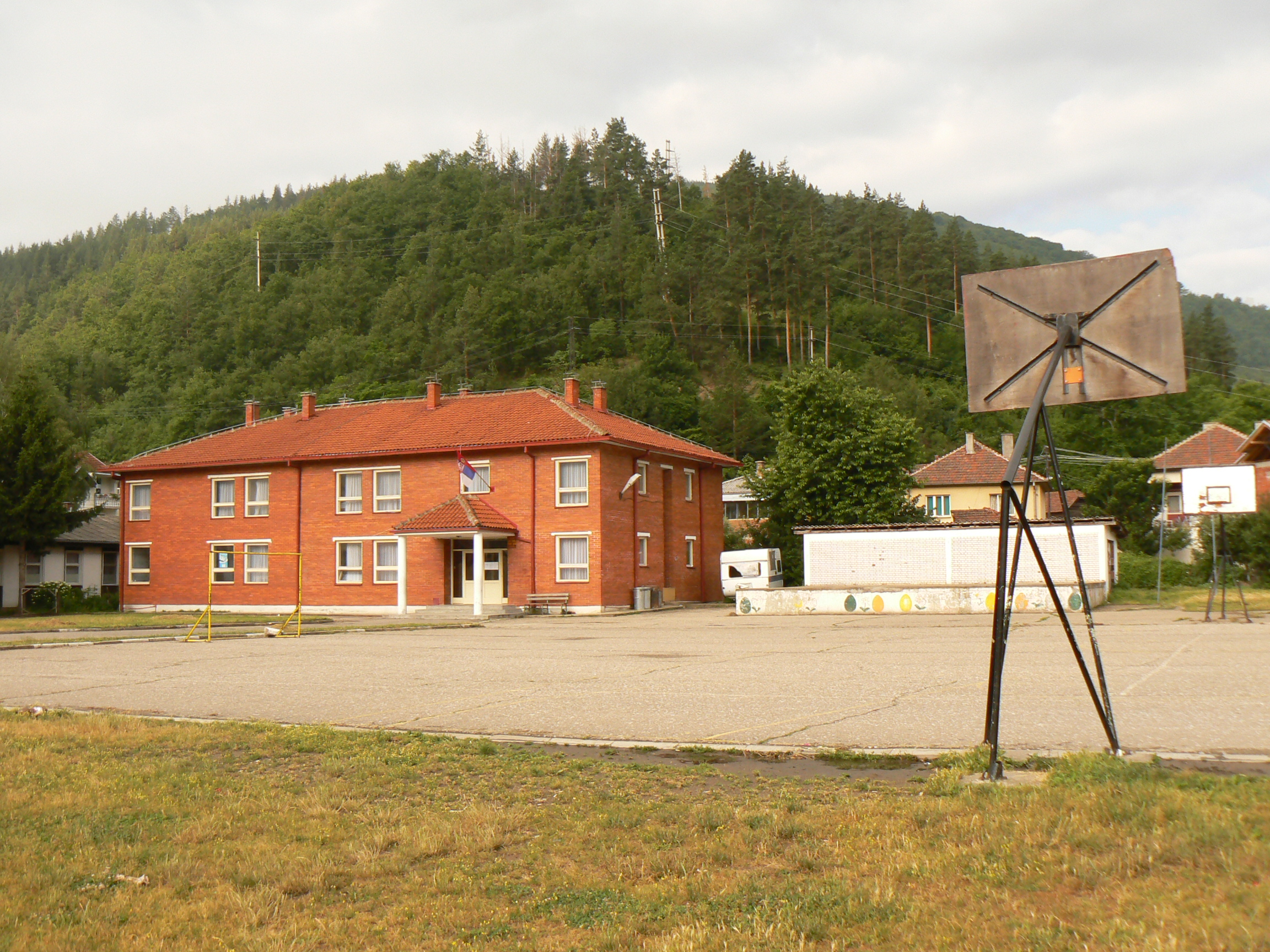
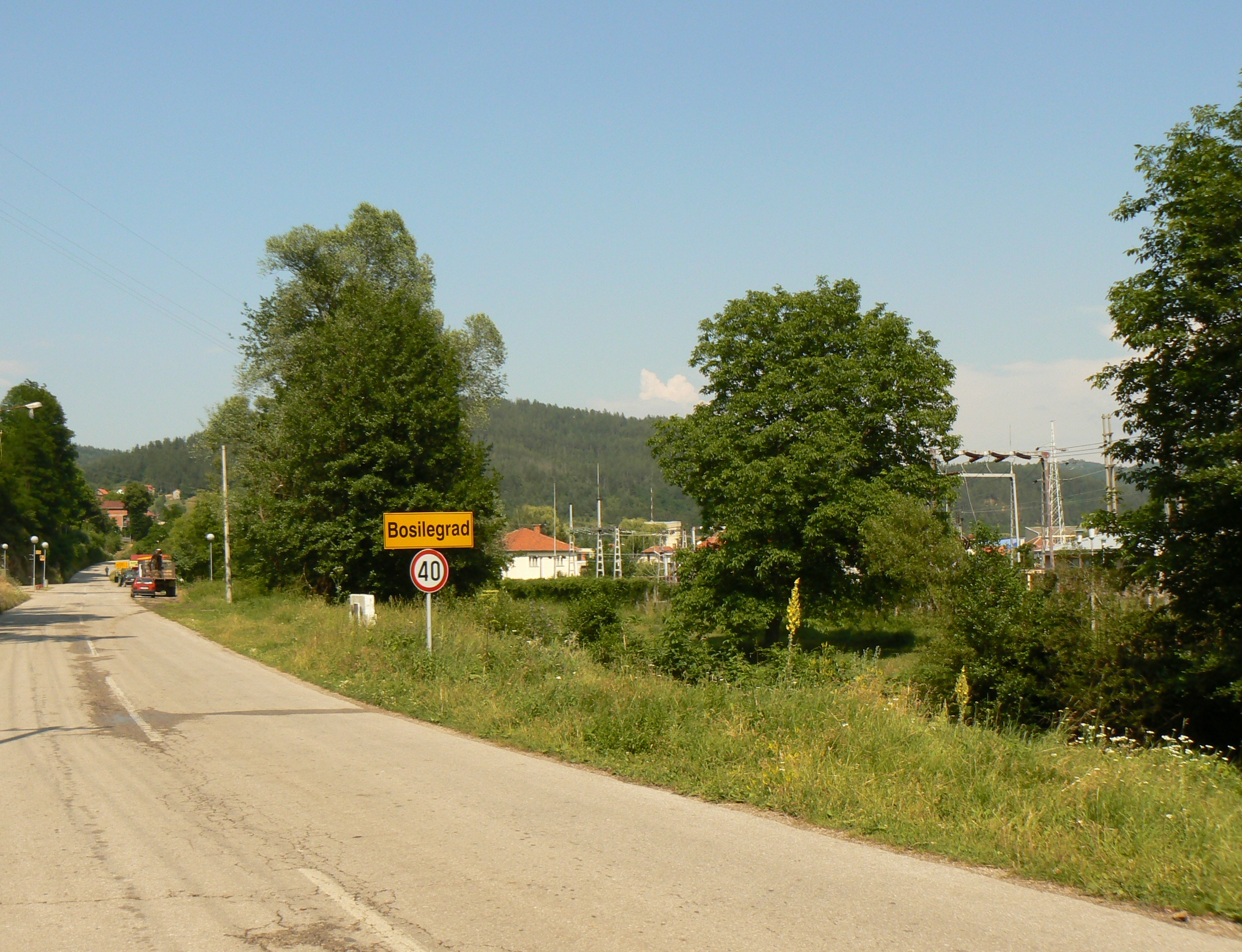
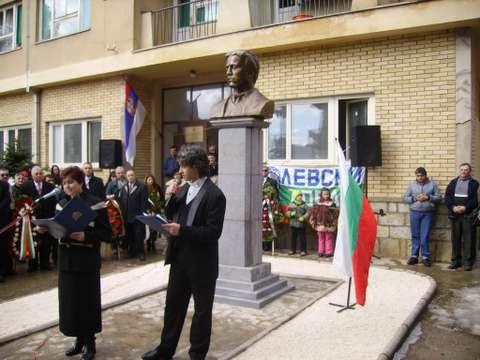
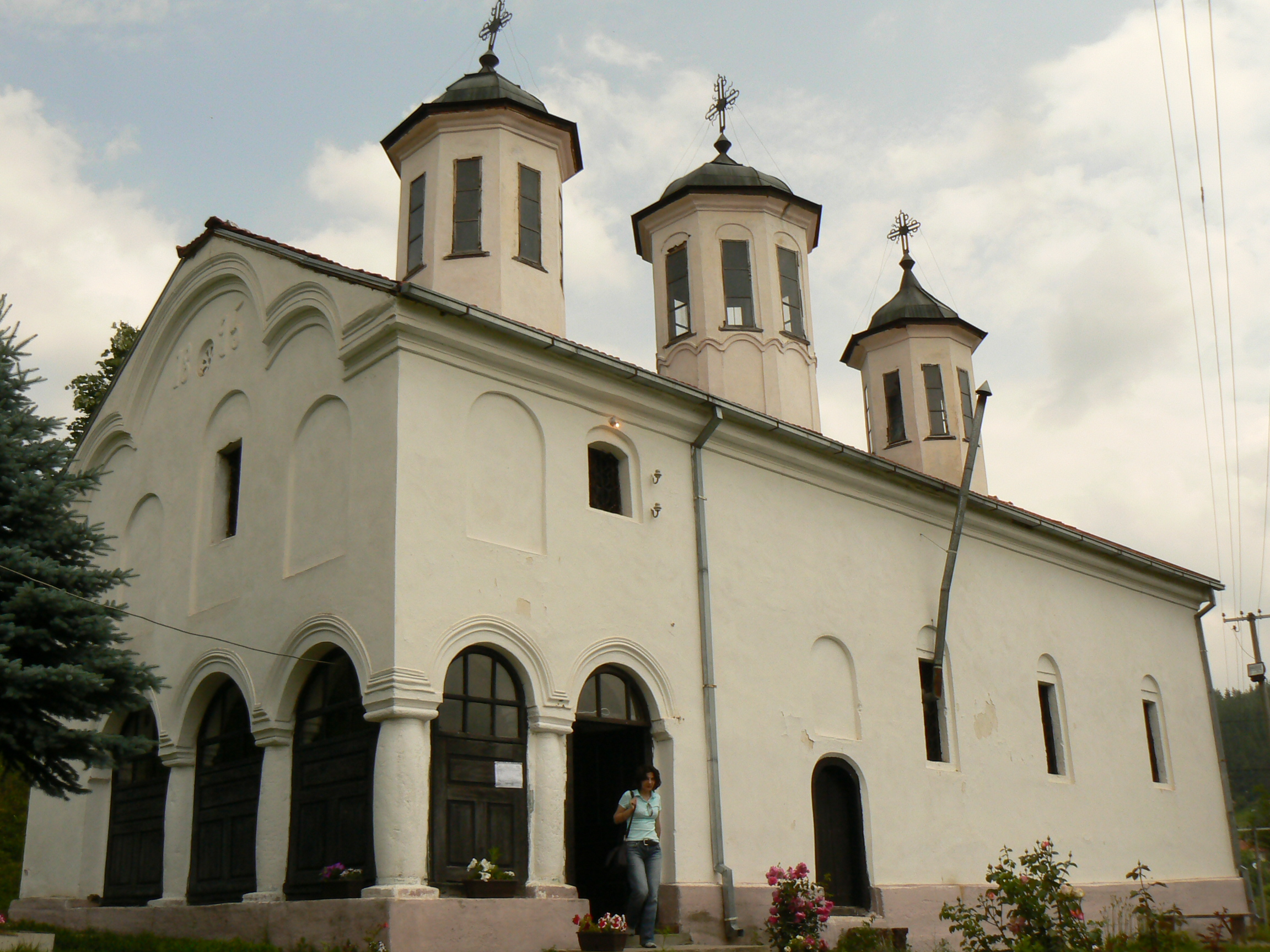
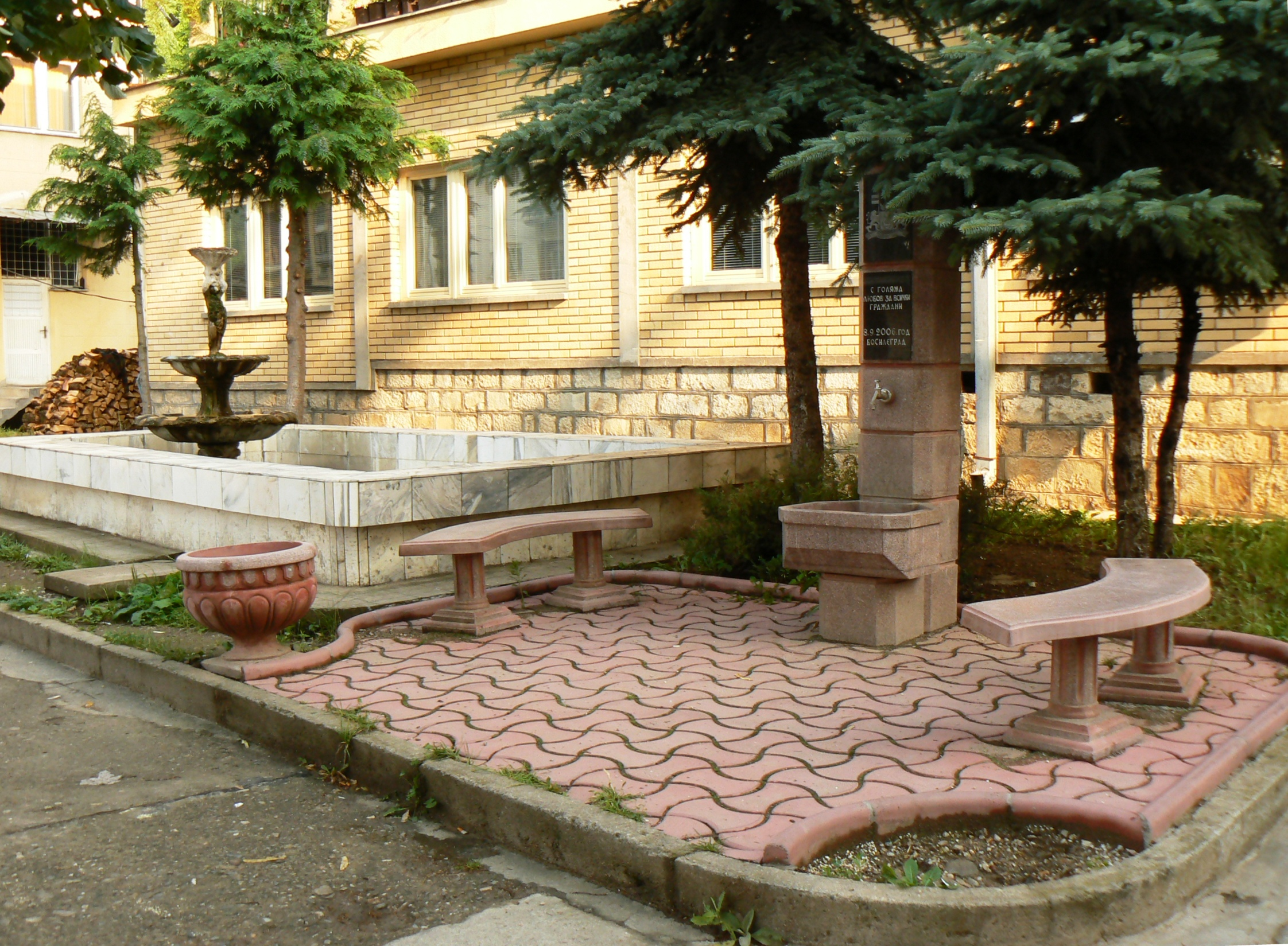

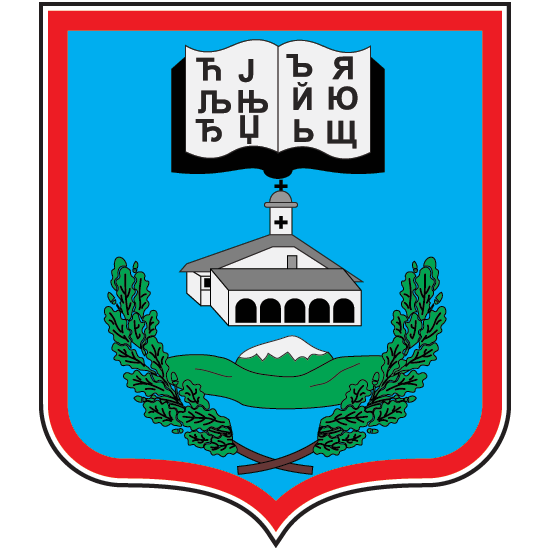
- Flag Coat of arms

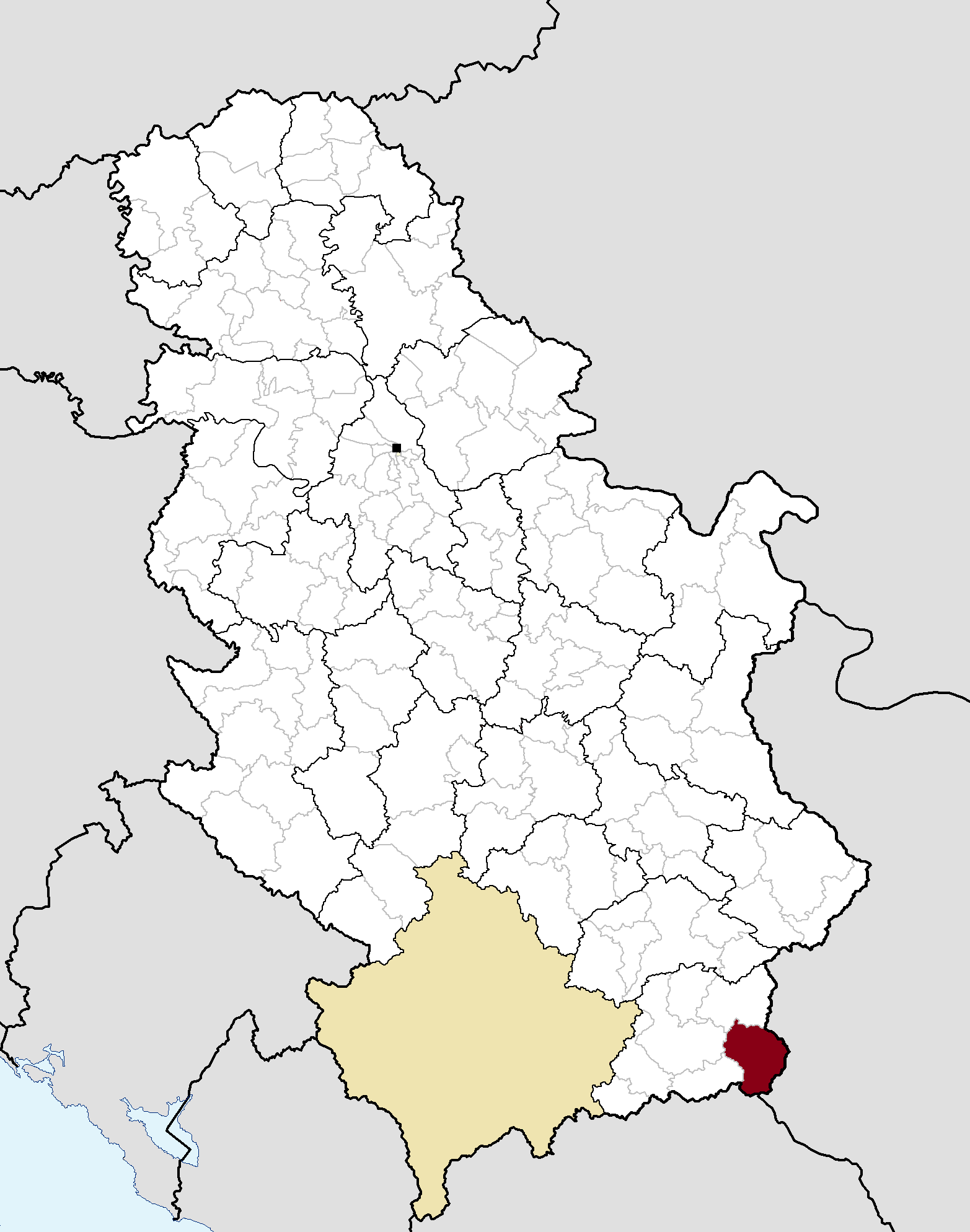
- Location of the municipality of Bosilegrad within Serbia
- Coordinates: 42°30′N 22°28′E
- Country: Serbia
- Region: Southern and Eastern Serbia
- District: Pčinja
- Settlements: 37

Government
  - Mayor: Vladimir Zaharijev (To Smo Mi)

Area
  - Town: 18.37 km^{2} (7.09 sq mi)
  - Municipality: 571 km^{2} (220 sq mi)
- Elevation: 696 m (2,283 ft)

Population (2022 census)
  - Town: 2,348
  - Town density: 127.8/km^{2} (331.0/sq mi)
  - Municipality: 6,065
  - Municipality density: 10.6/km^{2} (27.5/sq mi)
- Time zone: UTC+1 (CET)
  - Summer (DST): UTC+2 (CEST)
- Postal code: 17540
- Area code: +381(0)17
- Car plates: VR
- Official languages: Serbian together with Bulgarian
- Website: www.bosilegrad.org

Bosilegrad (Serbian Cyrillic: Босилеград; Bulgarian: Босилеград) is a town and municipality in the Pčinja District of southeast Serbia, on the border with Bulgaria. The municipality covers 571 km^{2} (220 sq mi) and comprises 37 settlements. At the 2022 census the urban settlement had 2,348 inhabitants and the municipality 6,065, of whom 4,075 (67.2%) declared Bulgarian ethnicity and 786 (13.0%) declared Serbian ethnicity.

Together with Dimitrovgrad (Tsaribrod), Bosilegrad is one of the two principal centres of the Bulgarian national minority in Serbia and the seat of the National Council of the Bulgarian National Minority. The municipality, formerly the south-western district of the Principality and then Kingdom of Bulgaria, was transferred to the Kingdom of Serbs, Croats and Slovenes under the 1919 Treaty of Neuilly and has since been part of Yugoslav and Serbian administrative structures.

== Geography ==
Bosilegrad lies in the historical region of Krajište (also Bosilegradsko Krajište; in Bulgarian usage the Kyustendil Kraishte) at the border between southeast Serbia and western Bulgaria. The municipality is bounded by Surdulica and Vlasotince to the west, Trgovište to the south, and the Bulgarian municipalities of Kyustendil and Tran to the east.

The terrain is mountainous, framed on the north and east by Milevska planina (with the peak Krvavi kamik at 1,738 m (5,702 ft)), on the west by Dukat planina, and connecting via Vlasinska planina to Besna Kobila (1,922 m (6,306 ft)), the highest summit of the broader Krajište area. The Dragovištica river (Bulgarian Dragovishtitsa) is formed at Bosilegrad by the confluence of the Božička and Ljubatska rivers and flows 63 km (39 mi) east into Bulgaria as a right tributary of the Struma, placing the municipality in the Aegean Sea drainage basin. Lisinsko jezero, an artificial reservoir on the Lisina river in the western part of the municipality, was built in the 1970s as part of the pumped-storage scheme associated with Vlasina Lake and the Vlasina cascade hydropower plants.

Bosilegrad lies in the Cfb–Dfb transition zone of the Köppen climate classification, between the temperate oceanic and humid continental belts, with cold and snowy winters and mild summers typical of the south-east Serbian highlands.

== History ==
The name combines the Slavic personal name Bosilj with the Old Church Slavonic element -grad ('town', 'fortified settlement'), the same element found in Beograd, Dimitrovgrad and Tsargrad. In nineteenth- and early-twentieth-century ethnography the name is used for both the small market town (varošica) and the surrounding cluster of villages forming the bosilegradski kraj.

The principal late nineteenth- and early twentieth-century studies of the region are by the Czech historian Konstantin Jireček, the Bulgarian medievalist Yordan Ivanov, the ethnographer Jordan Zahariev (Kjustendilsko Krajište, 1918), the geographer Rista T. Nikolić (Vlasina i Krajište, 1912), and Jovan Hadži-Vasiljević (Caribrod i Bosilegrad, 1924). These works were collected and re-edited in the 2016 Koreni series volume Vlasina i Krajište: naselja, poreklo stanovništva, običaji (Službeni glasnik – SANU), which serves as the standard anthology for the region. Recent scholarship on the region is concentrated, on the Bulgarian side, in the work of Angel Dzhonev and the Scientific Institute "Zapadni pokrayini" in Sofia and Kyustendil, and, on the Serbian side, in the work of Milovan Pisarri and Dmitar Tasić. Post-1989 Bulgarian historiography on the Western Outlands is surveyed in Detchev (2023).

=== Early settlement and Ottoman-period evidence ===
The historical record for Bosilegrad and its villages survives mainly through village names, church monuments, archaeological sites, and Ottoman fiscal documentation. The first written data for many settlements in the present municipality appear in sixteenth-century Ottoman defters; archaeological sites and church remains preserve earlier layers of settlement.

Krajište and the Pčinja valley lie within the central Balkan zone of long-term South Slavic settlement. The territory passed between Byzantine, Bulgarian and Serbian political control through the medieval period, with church organisation moving between the Ohrid Archbishopric, the Serbian Patriarchate of Peć and the Ecumenical Patriarchate. The term krajište ('borderland') is Old Slavic and was used in medieval Serbian and Bulgarian administrative practice for marcher regions where central authority was weak.

The Church of St Nicholas in Božica is one of the oldest preserved churches in the Vlasina and Bosilegradsko Krajište area. Its building, wall painting and original iconostasis date to the first decade of the seventeenth century; a later iconostasis was added in 1867 and 1883 by zographs including Zaharije Pop Radojkov. The church of the Holy Trinity in Izvor and the school opened there in 1833 are described as the earliest educational institution in the Izvor–Bosilegrad area. The Izvor school predated the formal end of Ottoman rule by several decades and fits the wider pattern of vernacular schooling and parish reading culture documented for the late phase of the Bulgarian National Revival in the central Balkans.

=== Nineteenth-century borderland ===
The Bulgarian Exarchate, established by Ottoman firman in 1870, restructured ecclesiastical jurisdiction across the area. The wars of 1877–1878 brought the borderland into the military history of Serbia and Bulgaria; Serbian troops entered Bosilegrad, Radomir and Slivnitsa in December 1877 and January 1878. The Treaty of San Stefano of March 1878 briefly assigned much of the central Balkan borderland to a large Bulgaria; this was annulled four months later by the Treaty of Berlin, which left Bosilegrad inside the autonomous Principality of Bulgaria. The town remained inside Bulgaria through the Serbo-Bulgarian War of 1885 and the Balkan Wars of 1912–1913, administered as part of the Kyustendil District. In May 1917 Bosilegrad was still within the Kingdom of Bulgaria, a fact relevant to dating the events of the Toplica Uprising.

From the 1880s through the early twentieth century, Bosilegrad functioned as a market and administrative centre for Bulgarian-speaking villages on the western edge of the Kyustendil District. The surrounding region is described in Bulgarian and Serbian ethnographic literature as part of the Šopluk/Šopsko cultural area, with a Torlakian–Šop transitional dialect that nineteenth-century travellers and philologists including Vuk Karadžić and Ami Boué described as standing between Serbian and Bulgarian. Recent comparative work on Balkan national ideologies treats this dialect-cultural area as a contested category constructed in the nineteenth-century Serbian–Bulgarian frontier rather than as a stable ethnographic unit.

=== Cultural institutions before the First World War ===
The first chitalishte in the Bosilegrad area was founded in Gornja Lisina in 1909, followed by one in Donja Ljubata in 1910 and the association "Bratstvo" in Bosilegrad in 1911. The chitalishte, combining public library, choir, amateur theatre and educational lecturing, was a common civic institution in Bulgarian provincial towns of the period and was promoted by the post-1878 Bulgarian state.

The Bosilegrad reading rooms suffered damage during the First World War, and their book collections were further depleted in the interwar and later wartime periods.

=== The Balkan Wars and the First World War ===
The Balkan Wars of 1912–1913 changed the political geography of the borderland. A Balkan League of Bulgaria, Serbia, Greece and Montenegro defeated the Ottoman armies in Europe in the First Balkan War; in the Second Balkan War of June–August 1913 Bulgaria attacked its former allies and was defeated, and the Treaty of Bucharest adjusted the central Balkan borders to Serbia's advantage. Bosilegrad and the surrounding Krajište remained inside Bulgaria after 1913, with the Bulgarian western frontier running closer than before to the new Bulgarian–Serbian line.

Bulgaria entered the First World War on the side of the Central Powers in October 1915 and, with Austria-Hungary and the German Empire, defeated the Kingdom of Serbia by the end of that year. Most of southern and eastern Serbia, including the Niš, Pirot and Vranje regions, came under Bulgarian military occupation administered as the Military Inspection Area of Morava, with its centre in Niš. The Bulgarian occupation regime applied a policy of "Bulgarisation", suppressing Serbian schools, language and church institutions, expelling Serbian clergy, and conscripting men of military age. Other features of the occupation included mass internment, deportations to camps inside Bulgaria and reprisals by IMRO-affiliated paramilitary detachments operating alongside Bulgarian regular forces.

In May 1917, during the Toplica Uprising in Bulgarian-occupied Serbia, the town of Bosilegrad was burned by Serbian chetnik forces under Kosta Pećanac. The uprising itself ran from 21 February to 25 March 1917, was the only mass anti-occupation rebellion in Europe during the war, and was suppressed by a combined Bulgarian and Austro-Hungarian force in which IMRO-affiliated bands under Aleksandar Protogerov and Tane Nikolov played a central repressive role.

After the main uprising was suppressed, Pećanac, who had been infiltrated into Toplica by air in late 1916, withdrew from open combat. In April and May 1917 his detachment carried out raids across the pre-war Bulgarian frontier; the railway station at Ristovac was attacked, and on 15–16 May 1917 Pećanac's men entered Bosilegrad, then a Bulgarian district centre, and burned the town. Pećanac then withdrew to Kosovo, at the time inside the Austro-Hungarian occupation zone, before re-emerging in 1918. Pećanac's chetnik raiders and the IMRO bands operated within a continuous post-1917 Balkan paramilitary world.

Bulgarian historiographic accounts compiled by Angel Dzhonev of the Bulgarian Academy of Sciences Institute for Historical Studies place the toll at approximately 35 civilian deaths in Bosilegrad and the surrounding villages and the destruction of the property of 317 households, with damage estimated at over 2.5 million leva of the period. These figures underlie the touring documentary exhibition The Pogrom in Bosilegrad (15–16 May 1917).

Interpretations of the attack diverge between Serbian and Bulgarian historiography. Bulgarian-language accounts emphasise the burning of Bosilegrad as an attack by Serbian irregulars on a Bulgarian civilian town beyond the active war zone; Serbian-language accounts place it within the wider chetnik response to a Bulgarian occupation that included mass deportations, the Surdulica massacre of Serbian intelligentsia in 1916–1917, and the IMRO-led suppression of the Toplica Uprising.

=== Neuilly, the Kingdom of Serbs, Croats and Slovenes, and interwar administration ===
Under the Treaty of Neuilly-sur-Seine of 27 November 1919, Bulgaria, defeated alongside the rest of the Central Powers, accepted frontier changes in favour of the newly formed Kingdom of Serbs, Croats and Slovenes. The treaty obliged Bulgaria to cede approximately 1,545 km² of territory along its western border to the new state, including the Bosilegrad and Tsaribrod (later Dimitrovgrad) districts in the modern Pčinja and Pirot districts. Bosilegrad and the surrounding Krajište were handed over to Yugoslav administration on 6 November 1920, when the Serbian Army occupied the ceded territories and the Bulgarian National Assembly suspended its sittings as a sign of national mourning; in Bulgarian public memory the frontier is known as the "Black Border" (Černa granica).

The transition was contested. The Internal Western Outland Revolutionary Organisation (IWORO, Bulgarian Vatreshna zapadnopokrayska revolyutsionna organizatsiya) was founded in 1921 as a satellite of the IMRO and operated in the Tsaribrod and Bosilegrad areas with an explicit annexationist programme. From 1922 IWORO carried out armed attacks on the Tsaribrod–Belgrade railway and on Yugoslav garrisons. The Yugoslav state response, organised by surviving chetnik veterans under Pećanac, was the Association against Bulgarian Bandits, operating across the Vardar and Western Outlands area. The counter-paramilitary cycle was a defining feature of the inter-war Yugoslav south-east.

In Yugoslav administrative practice, Bosilegrad was integrated into the regional structures of southern Serbia and from 1929 belonged to the Vardar Banovina. In Bulgarian usage, the territories transferred from Bulgaria after the war are referred to as the "Western Outlands" (Zapadni pokrayini) and treated as a distinct historical-geographical category.

=== Second World War and socialist Yugoslavia ===
After the Axis invasion of Yugoslavia in April 1941, the Kingdom of Bulgaria, which had joined the Tripartite Pact on 1 March 1941, was permitted by Germany to occupy most of Vardar Macedonia and parts of eastern Serbia, including the Pirot district and the Western Outlands. Bosilegrad was reincorporated into the Bulgarian state space between April 1941 and the autumn of 1944. The occupying administration applied a policy of Bulgarian-language education, ecclesiastical reorganisation under the Bulgarian Orthodox Church, and integration of local administration into Bulgarian provincial structures.

After the coup of 9 September 1944 in Sofia, Bulgaria joined the Allies. In October 1944 Bulgarian forces withdrew from the occupied Yugoslav territories, including the Western Outlands, which were returned to Yugoslav authority.

The 1948 Cominform rift reversed the rapid post-war Bulgarian–Yugoslav rapprochement and tightened the frontier regime on both sides of the Krajište. Cross-border movement at Bosilegrad and Dimitrovgrad was severely restricted, and the local Bulgarian intelligentsia faced repeated waves of administrative suspicion through the early 1950s. The rift began a quarter-century in which Belgrade and Sofia instrumentalised their respective minorities. Yugoslav recognition of a separate Macedonian nationality in Pirin Bulgaria was formally rescinded, and reciprocal hardening followed against the Bulgarian minority in Bosilegrad and Dimitrovgrad. Bulgaria imposed a parallel border-zone regime opposite the Krajište, which the Yugoslav side mirrored.

After the early 1950s, Yugoslav minority policy granted ethnic Bulgarians recognised national-minority status, with Bulgarian-language schooling, press and cultural institutions in Bosilegrad and Dimitrovgrad. The town library was established as an independent institution in 1966, building on earlier reading-room and school-library traditions; it later took the name "Hristo Botev" and developed an active local-history publishing programme.

The demographic pattern that became decisive after the 1960s took shape during the socialist decades. Bosilegrad municipality had 18,816 inhabitants in 1948 and 8,129 in 2011, with a sharper fall in the rural population. Most of the long-term loss is attributable to migration rather than natural decrease, and Bosilegrad is grouped in the Serbian demographic literature with other mountainous border municipalities such as Crna Trava, Trgovište and Babušnica as a case of extreme depopulation.

=== Post-1990 period ===
By the mid-1990s the municipal council of Bosilegrad was made up entirely of self-identified Bulgarians. Restrictive Yugoslav-era policies on Bulgarian-language schooling, ecclesiastical use and cross-border travel persisted through the early Federal Republic of Yugoslavia period, including the UN sanctions years of the early 1990s.

Vladimir Zaharijev has been mayor of Bosilegrad continuously since 2001, leading the local list To Smo Mi ('That Is Us'); he was re-elected to a seventh mandate in 2024. Zaharijev also served as president of the National Council of the Bulgarian National Minority from 2014 to 2018; he was succeeded as Council president in December 2018 by Stefan Stojkov.

During the 2015 European migrant crisis, hundreds of thousands of people transited through Serbia along the Western Balkan Route from Turkey toward central and northern Europe. In response to continuing arrivals from Bulgaria, the Commissariat for Refugees and Migration of the Republic of Serbia opened a reception centre at Bosilegrad on 19 October 2016, with an official capacity of 110 places, alongside parallel centres at Dimitrovgrad, Pirot and Bela Palanka. The centre received migrants and asylum-seekers entering from Bulgaria over the following years and was briefly overcrowded in November 2023. EU funds financed a reconstruction that increased the available bed count. The reception centre was closed in the first half of 2024 as arrivals to Serbia fell.

A series of incidents in 2023 brought the activity of the Cultural and Information Centre under public scrutiny. In August 2023 the journalist Aleksandar Dimitrov, chairman of the Bosilegrad-based Glas association, was denied entry to Serbia while carrying three copies of Edvin Sugarev's book Elegija o Krajištu (Elegy for the Krajište); the case was raised in the European Parliament. On 8 November 2023, on the order of the Vranje High Court, Serbian authorities seized 23 copies of the book from the Cultural and Information Centre hours before a scheduled book promotion marking the Day of the Western Outlands (commemorating the 6 November 1920 transfer of the territories to Yugoslavia). Ivan Nikolov, chairman of the Centre, was indicted for "inciting national, racial and religious hatred and intolerance"; Sugarev, a former Bulgarian Consul General in Niš, and three other Bulgarian citizens were barred from entering Serbia. In its 7 May 2025 resolution on the 2023 and 2024 Commission reports on Serbia, the European Parliament "regrets searches carried out by Serbian authorities at the Bosilegrad Cultural Centre and the initiation of pre-trial proceedings for 'ethnic hatred' against activists from non-governmental organisations" and expresses concern at the promotion of "narratives such as that of the 'Shopi nation', which seek to erase the existence of the Bulgarian community and deny its historical roots and cultural heritage".

== Government and politics ==
Bosilegrad is a municipality (opština) of the Republic of Serbia, with elected municipal assembly and mayor. The municipality is led by Vladimir Zaharijev of the local list To Smo Mi, who has been mayor since 2001. Under the Statute of the Municipality of Bosilegrad, Serbian and Bulgarian are both in official use, with the Cyrillic script employed for both.

The municipality functions as the seat of the National Council of the Bulgarian National Minority in Serbia, established under the 2002 Law on the Protection of Rights and Freedoms of National Minorities and reorganised as a directly elected body in 2010. At the 2022 council elections the To Smo Mi list won the largest number of seats, and Stefan Stojkov continued as Council president following his election in December 2018. The Council adopted its 2026–2031 development strategy at its tenth regular session in Bosilegrad on 26 January 2026.

== Demography ==
Historical population
Year	Pop.	±% p.a.
1948	18,816	—
1953	19,751	+0.97%
1961	18,368	−0.90%
1971	17,306	−0.59%
1981	14,196	−1.96%
1991	11,644	−1.96%
2002	9,931	−1.44%
2011	8,129	−2.20%
2022	6,065	−2.63%

The 2022 census recorded 6,065 inhabitants in the municipality, of whom 2,348 lived in the urban settlement of Bosilegrad. The municipal population has fallen by roughly two-thirds since 1948 and by about a quarter since 2011, placing Bosilegrad among Serbia's most strongly depopulating municipalities together with Crna Trava, Babušnica and Trgovište. Land-use studies of the rural border zone show a strong correlation between the contraction of households in Bosilegrad and similar municipalities and the reduction of agricultural land, with significant natural reforestation of abandoned land between 1990 and 2018.

=== Ethnic groups ===
In the 2022 census, Bulgarians formed 67.2% of the municipal population (4,075), Serbs 13.0% (786), and Roma 2.4% (143). In Yugoslav-era censuses (1971, 1981, 1991), ethnic Bulgarians in the municipality were not always tabulated as a separate category in publicly released summary tables and were frequently aggregated into the "Yugoslav" or "other" national-affiliation columns; the 1981 figure of 3,976 self-declared Yugoslavs reflects classification practice typical of that census.

Ethnic group	Population 1971	Population 1981	Population 1991	Population 2002	Population 2011	Population 2022
Bulgarians	–	–	–	7,037	5,839	4,075
Serbs	292	616	1,165	1,308	895	786
Macedonians	58	49	–	42	38	26
Montenegrins	13	6	6	3	2	1
Romani	13	10	3	–	162	143
Muslims	1	1	10	–	–	–
Yugoslavs	255	3,976	1,649	288	20	18
Others	16,675	9,538	8,811	1,253	1,173	1,016
Total	17,306	14,196	11,644	9,931	8,129	6,065

== Economy ==
The municipality's economy combines small-household agriculture with limited industrial activity. Bosilegrad and Dimitrovgrad have higher unemployment and lower economic output per capita than the Serbian average; weak transport infrastructure and demographic decline are the principal constraints on local development. The wider Pčinja District has low socio-economic development, weak infrastructure, and an ageing population dependent on small-household agriculture.

The Lisina phosphate deposit in the municipality is one of the largest phosphorite occurrences in Serbia, with estimated resources of about 95 Mt at an average P₂O₅ grade of around 10%. The phosphorite layer is 5.5 km long and 16–32 m thick, dipping 20–30° to the north-east in the valley of the Božička river from Bosilegrad to Donja Lisina, and is metamorphic in origin.

Approximately 30 km southeast of the town, on the polymetallic Karamanica ore field, the Bosil-Metal company has operated a pilot lead–zinc–copper flotation facility since 2017 with a nominal annual capacity of 25,000 tonnes; the company has applied for a permit to scale to about 240,000 tonnes per annum, with two flotation plants on the Karamanica and Golema rivers. The expansion has been challenged before the Bern Convention Standing Committee and the Espoo Convention Implementation Committee on grounds of transboundary water and biodiversity impact; the Implementation Committee found that "both parties had breached the Espoo Convention" and that the mine "is likely to cause a significant adverse transboundary impact" on the Dragovištica catchment in Bulgaria. The Serbian Nature Conservation Agency has issued a negative opinion on the expansion, citing risks to protected species. Ambient gamma dose-rates at the Karamanica and Lisina sites range from 70 to 150 nSv h⁻¹, within UNSCEAR reference levels.

== Transport ==
Bosilegrad lies on state road IB-39, which runs from Niš via Vlasotince, Crna Trava and Vlasina Okruglica to the Ribarci–Oltomantsi border crossing with Bulgaria; the crossing connects to Bulgarian National Road 601 to Kyustendil. The Ribarci crossing operates 24 hours a day; from Bosilegrad the route to Kyustendil is roughly 67 km (37 km on the Serbian side, 30 km on the Bulgarian side). There is no rail link; the Sofia–Gyueshevo railway in Bulgaria terminates short of the Bosilegrad pocket of the frontier.

== Education ==
Education in Bosilegrad is organised in line with the Law on the Official Use of Language and Script and provides instruction in Serbian, in Bulgarian, or bilingually, with the "Bulgarian Language with Elements of National Culture" subject offered as an elective where the language of instruction is Serbian. Serbia has approved bilingual Bulgarian–Serbian instruction for classes as small as three pupils, although the Council of Europe Committee of Experts on the European Charter for Regional or Minority Languages has called for fuller textbook translation and stronger teacher provision. At Bosilegrad's secondary school, the 2025–2026 final-year cohort comprised 36 pupils, of whom 5 followed Bulgarian-medium instruction and 31 followed Serbian-medium instruction; the school participates in admissions-orientation events with Bulgarian universities.

== Culture and media ==
The Cultural and Information Centre "Bosilegrad" was established on 2 October 1998 under a bilateral agreement between the Republic of Bulgaria and the Federal Republic of Yugoslavia, which opened parallel centres in Bosilegrad and Tsaribrod (Dimitrovgrad). The Centre publishes Bulgarian-language books, organises lectures and exhibitions, and operates the annual commemoration of the Day of the Western Outlands on 6 November.

Novo Bratstvo (Ново братство, 'New Brotherhood') is a Bulgarian-language minority newspaper continuously published in Serbia since 1949, originally as a supplement to the Pirot paper Pirotska Svoboda and later as a standalone weekly; following a break between 2012 and 2016 it has appeared bi-weekly. The paper is owned by the National Council of the Bulgarian National Minority and covers Bosilegrad, Tsaribrod and Bulgarian-minority cultural life. The children's magazine Drugarče was published 1960–2012 and was succeeded by a quarterly children's publication launched in the 2020s for primary-school pupils in Bosilegrad and Tsaribrod. A new minority-media project, supported by the OSCE Mission to Serbia, was launched in Bosilegrad in 2024.

The "Hristo Botev" Public Library was constituted as an independent institution in 1966 with about 1,200 volumes; it adopted its present name in 2002 and holds over 42,000 volumes as of the mid-2020s, with an active local-history publishing programme.

== Religion ==
Bosilegrad is under the canonical jurisdiction of the Serbian Orthodox Diocese of Vranje (Eparhija vranjska) of the Serbian Orthodox Church. The diocese includes a number of mediaeval and post-mediaeval monasteries in the area, among them the Monastery of St Demetrius (Manastir Svetog Dimitrija) near Bresnica, whose surviving fabric is dated to the late mediaeval period.

== Bulgarian minority status and international monitoring ==
The Advisory Committee on the Framework Convention for the Protection of National Minorities adopted its Fifth Opinion on Serbia (ACFC/OP/V(2024)5) on 26 February 2025, identifying gaps in Bulgarian-language textbooks and a contraction of the Bulgarian-language press as continuing concerns for the Bulgarian community in Bosilegrad. The European Commission's annual Serbia progress reports for 2023 and 2024 record the search of the Cultural and Information Centre "Bosilegrad" and the proceedings against Ivan Nikolov as matters of concern; the European Parliament resolution of 7 May 2025 takes the same position and calls on Serbia to address Bulgarian-minority concerns as part of EU accession negotiations under Cluster 3 ("Competitiveness and inclusive growth").

Cross-border cooperation programmes funded under the successive Interreg IPA Cross-Border Cooperation Programmes Bulgaria–Serbia (2007–2013, 2014–2020 and 2021–2027) have financed infrastructure, environmental and cultural projects in the Pčinja and Kyustendil border zone, with Bosilegrad as one of the principal Serbian beneficiary localities.

== Settlements ==
In addition to the town of Bosilegrad, the municipality includes the following villages:

- Barje
- Belut
- Bistar
- Brankovci
- Bresnica
- Buceljevo
- Gložje
- Goleš
- Gornja Lisina
- Gornja Ljubata
- Gornja Ržana
- Gornje Tlamino
- Grujinci
- Doganica
- Donja Lisina
- Donja Ljubata
- Donja Ržana
- Donje Tlamino
- Dukat
- Žeravino
- Zli Dol
- Izvor
- Jarešnik
- Karamanica
- Milevci
- Mlekominci
- Musulj
- Nazarica
- Paralovo
- Ploča
- Radičevci
- Rajčilovci
- Resen
- Ribarci
- Rikačevo
- Crnoštica

== Gallery ==
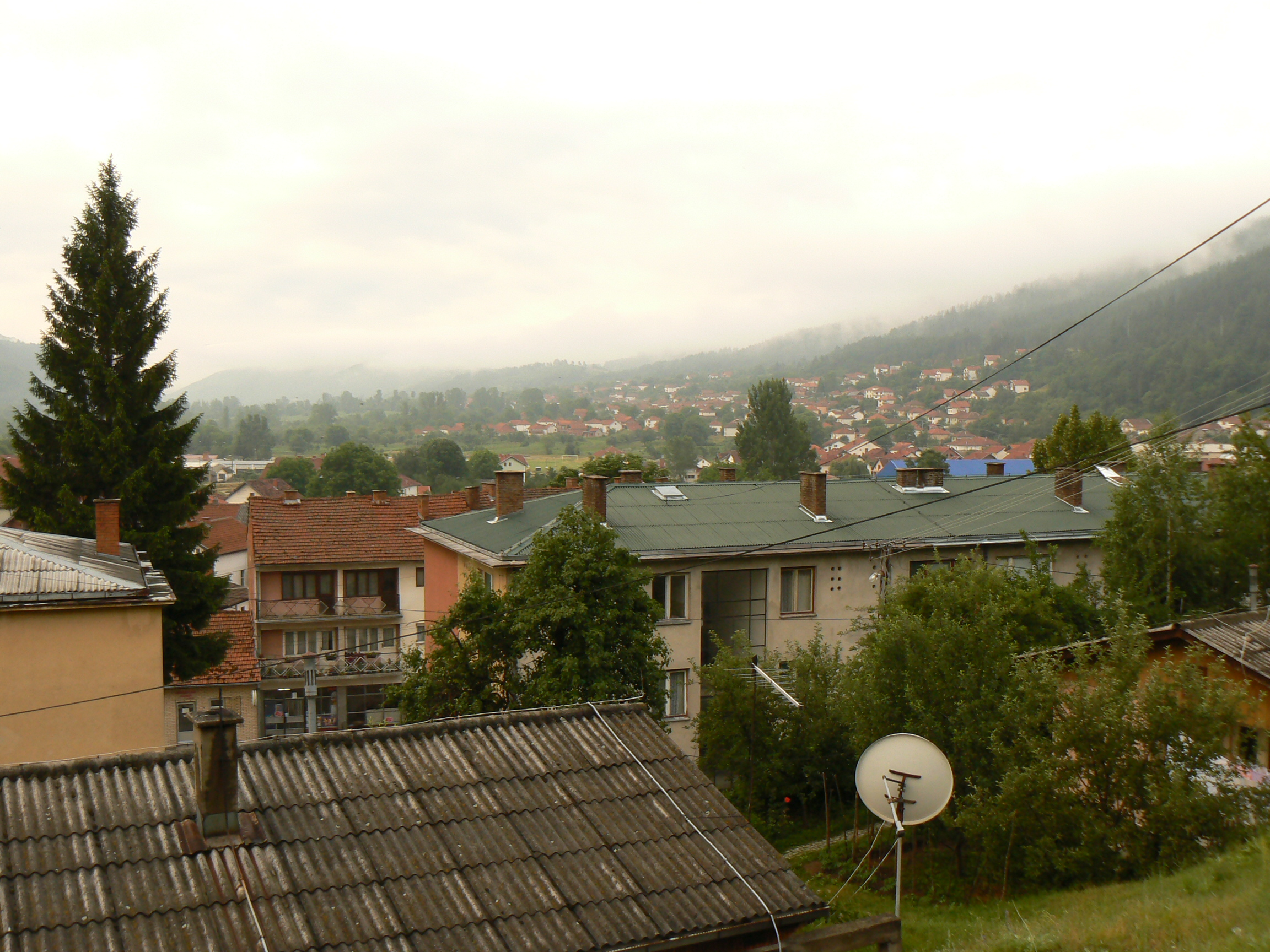
Town of Bosilegrad

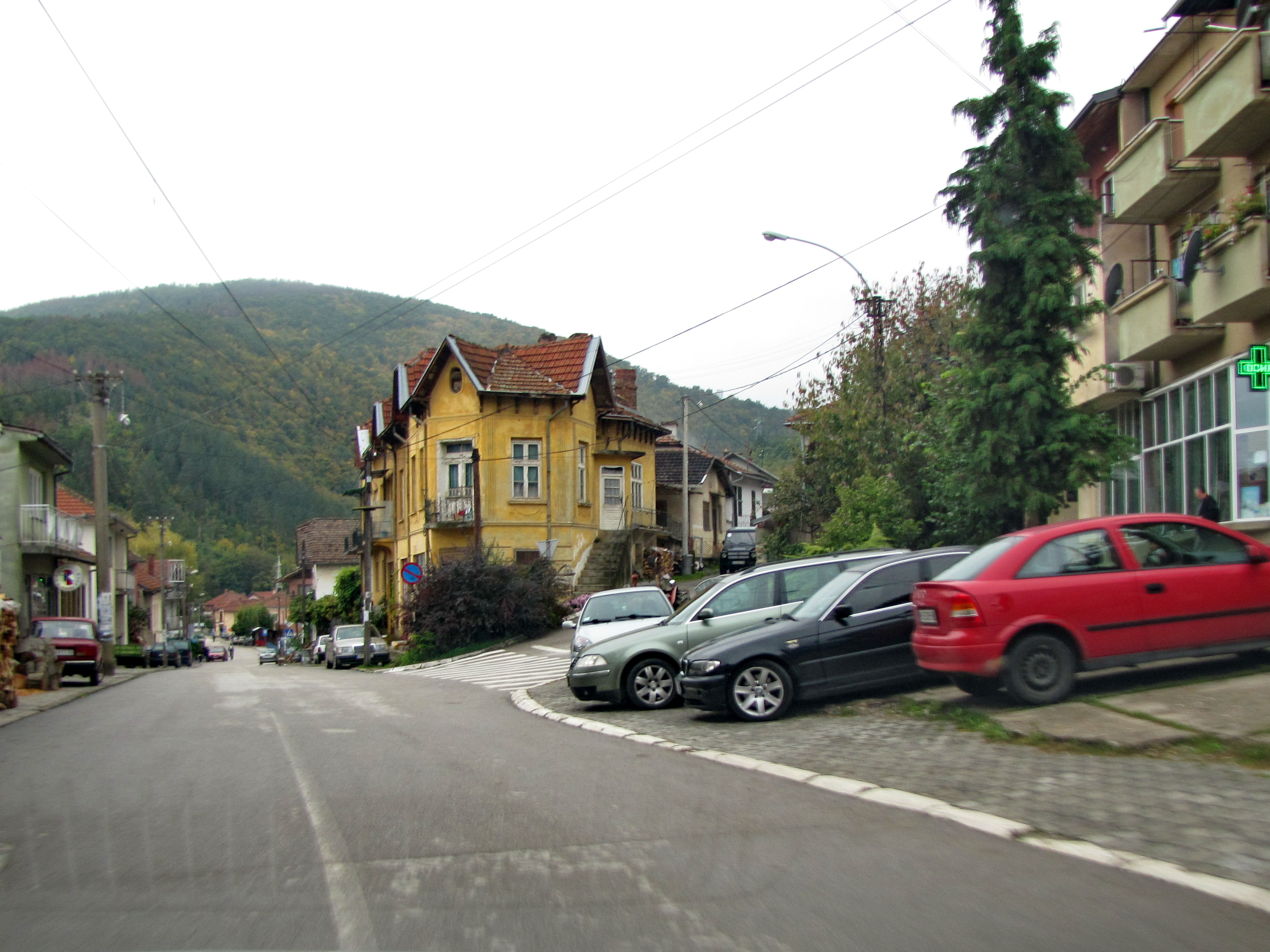
Bosilegrad town street

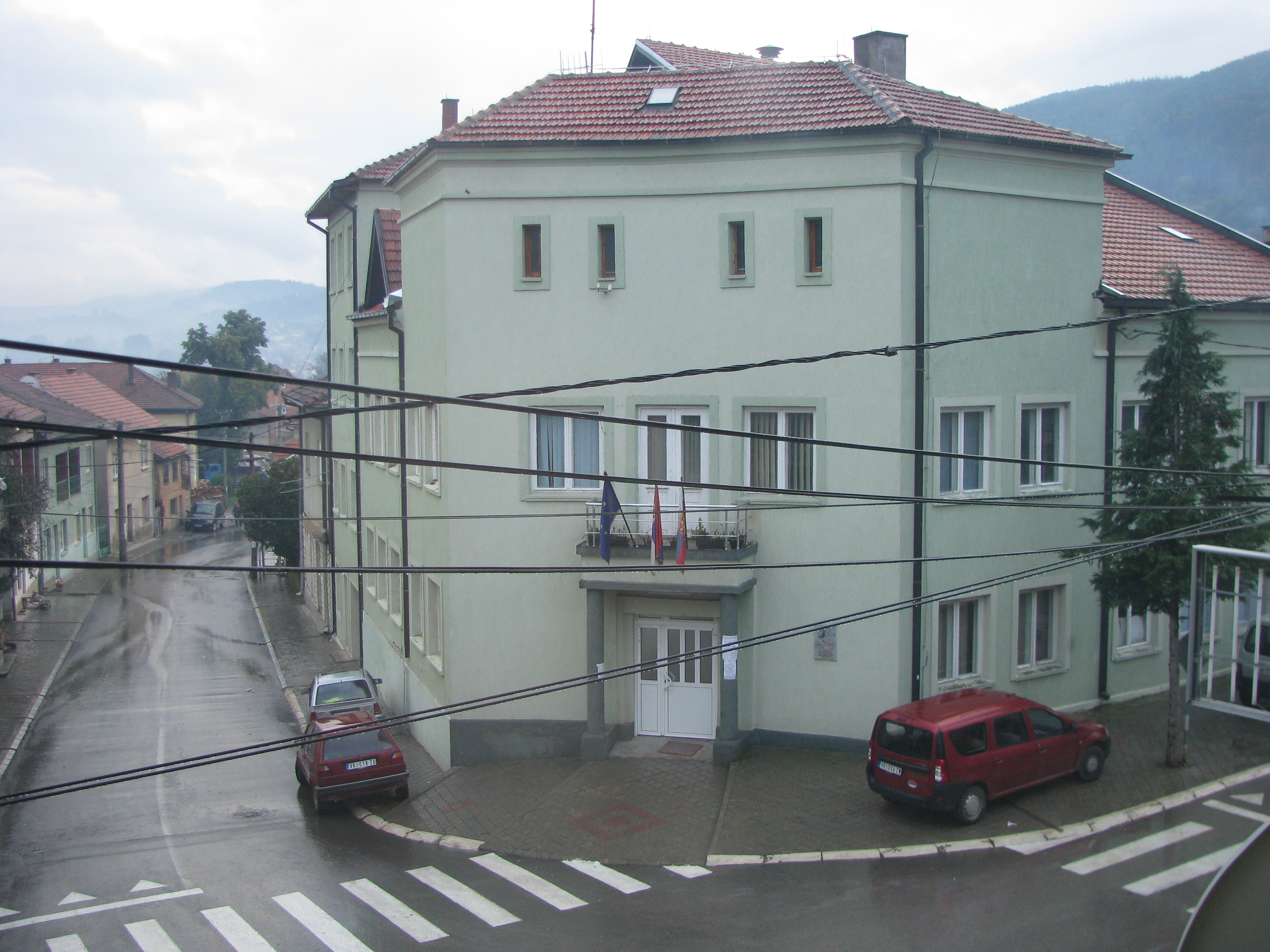
Bosilegrad town hall

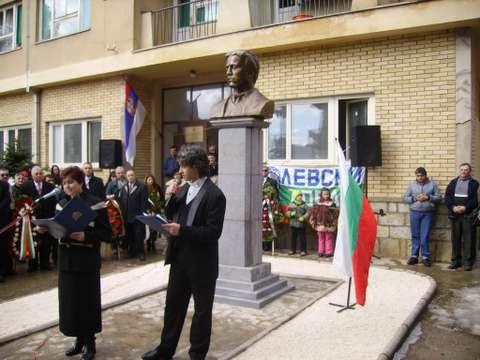
Unveiling of the monument of Bulgarian revolutionary Vasil Levski

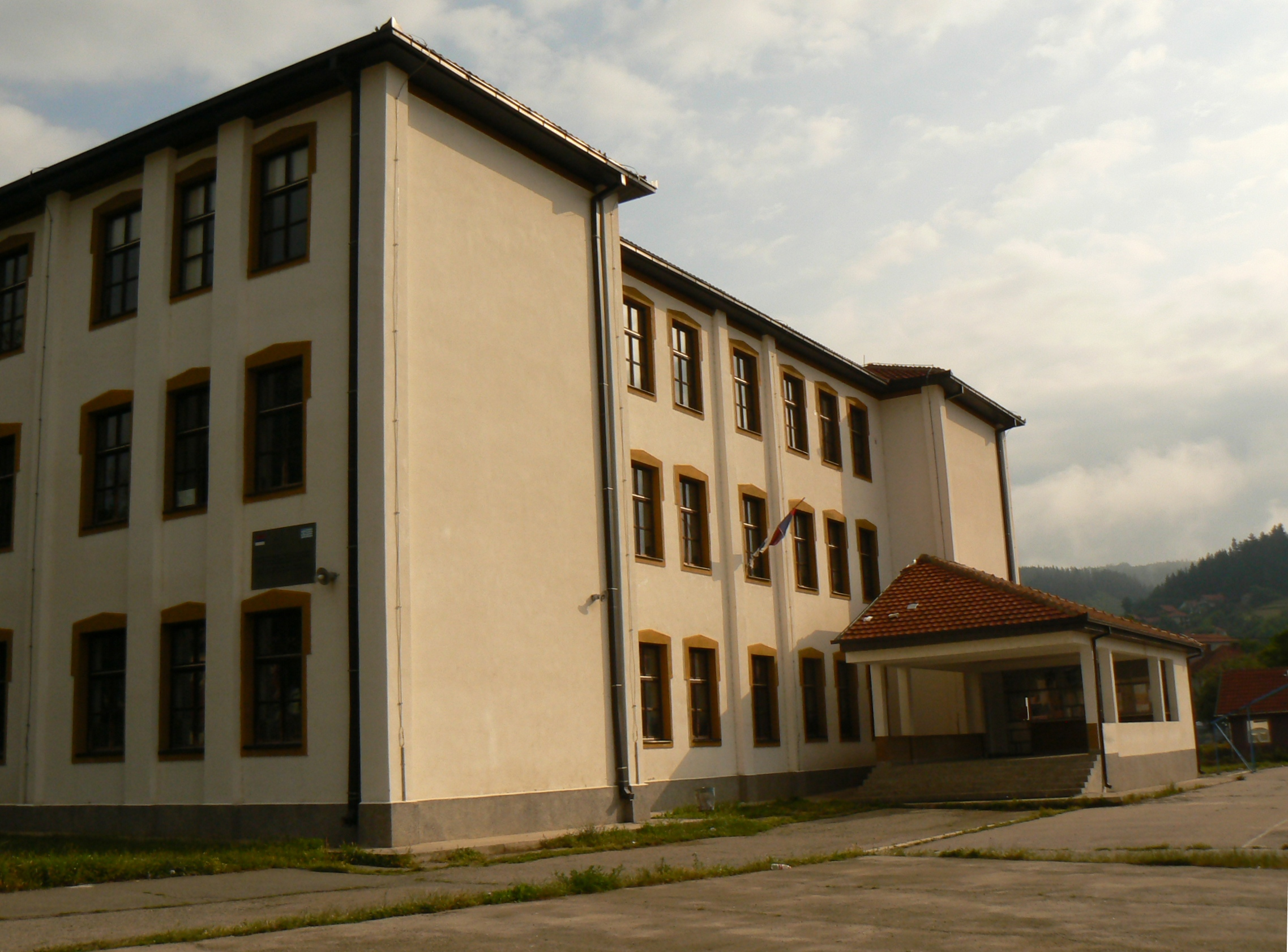
School in Bosilegrad

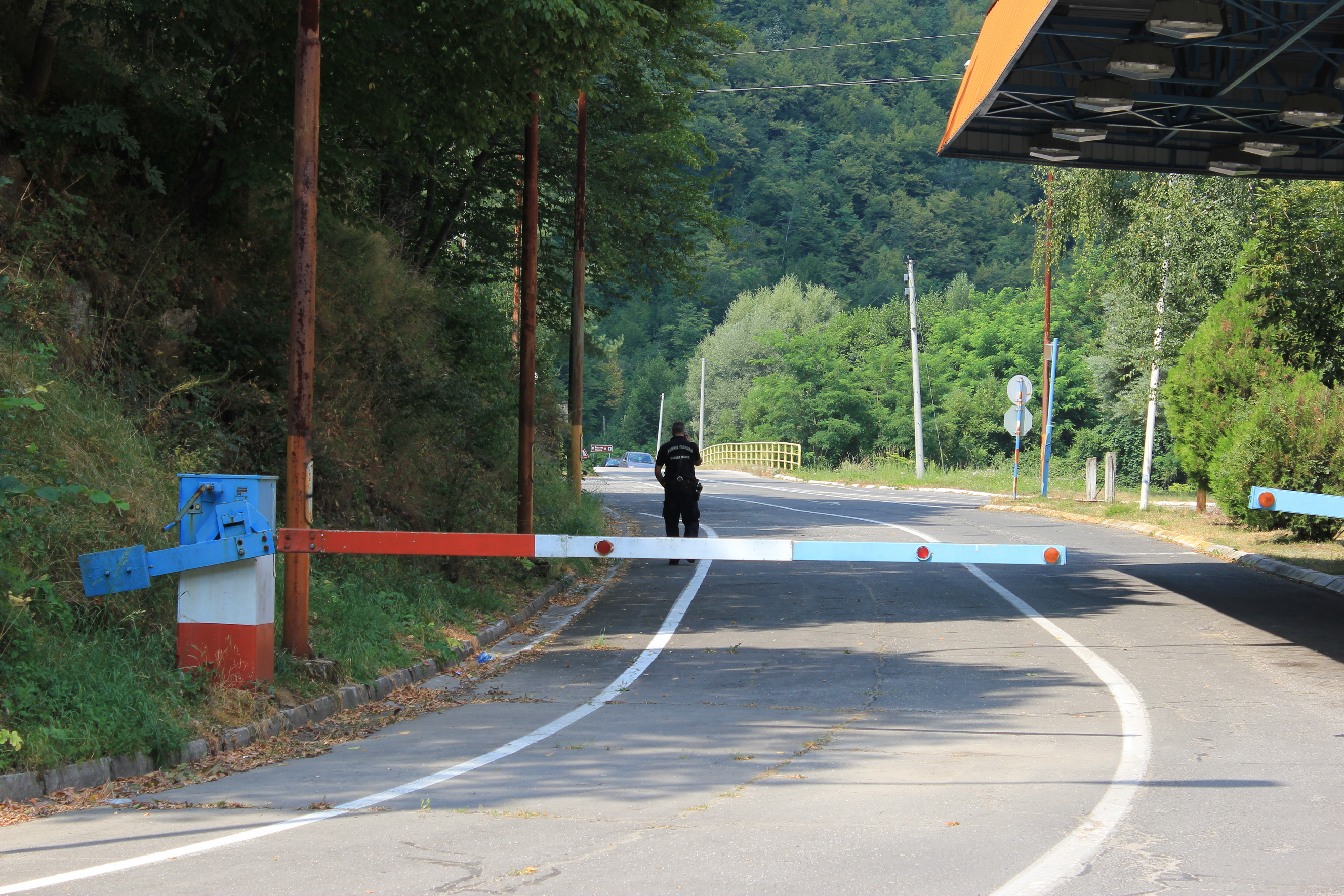
Serbia–Bulgaria state border

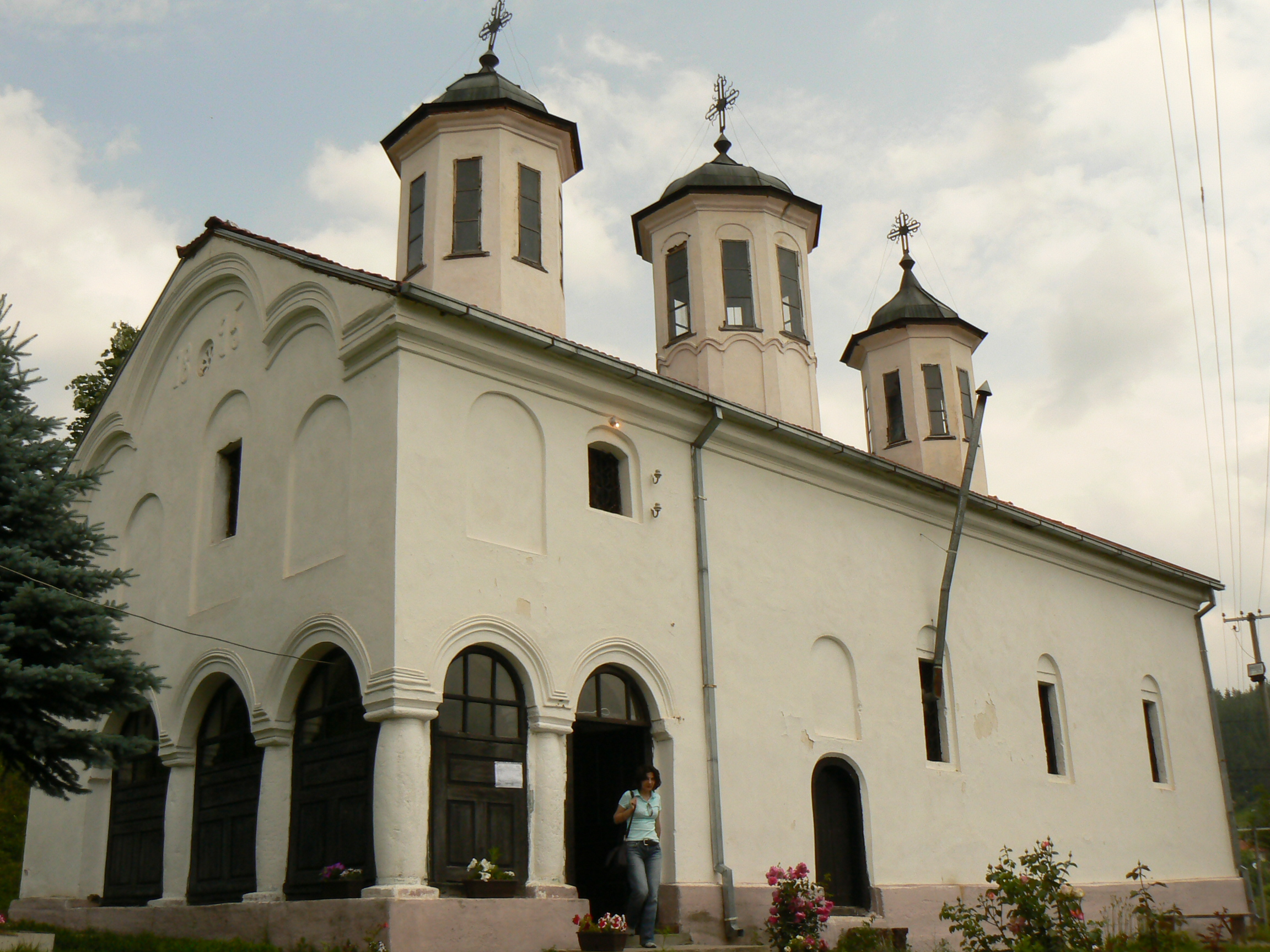
Bosilegrad church

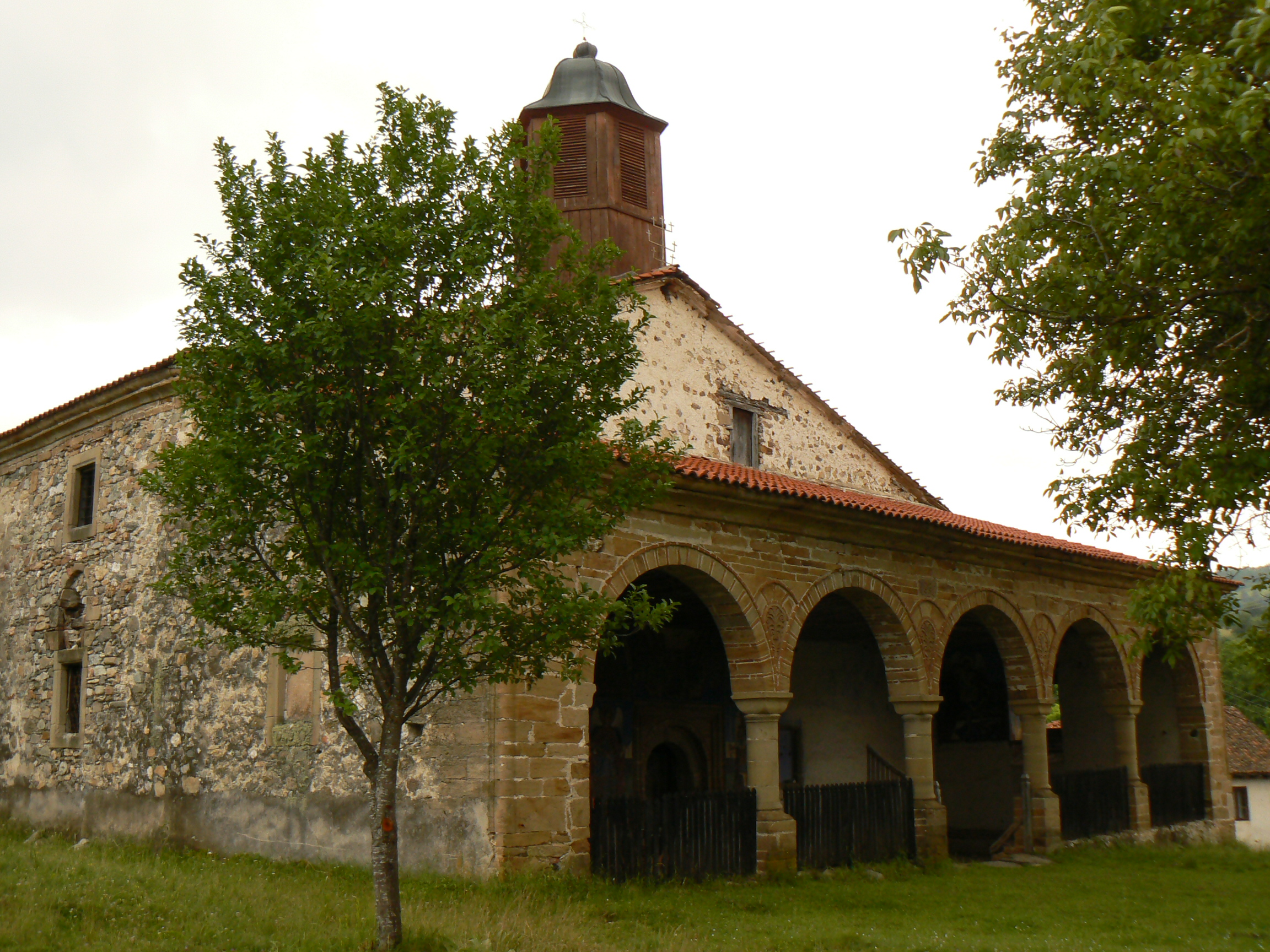
Church in Izvor, Bosilegrad

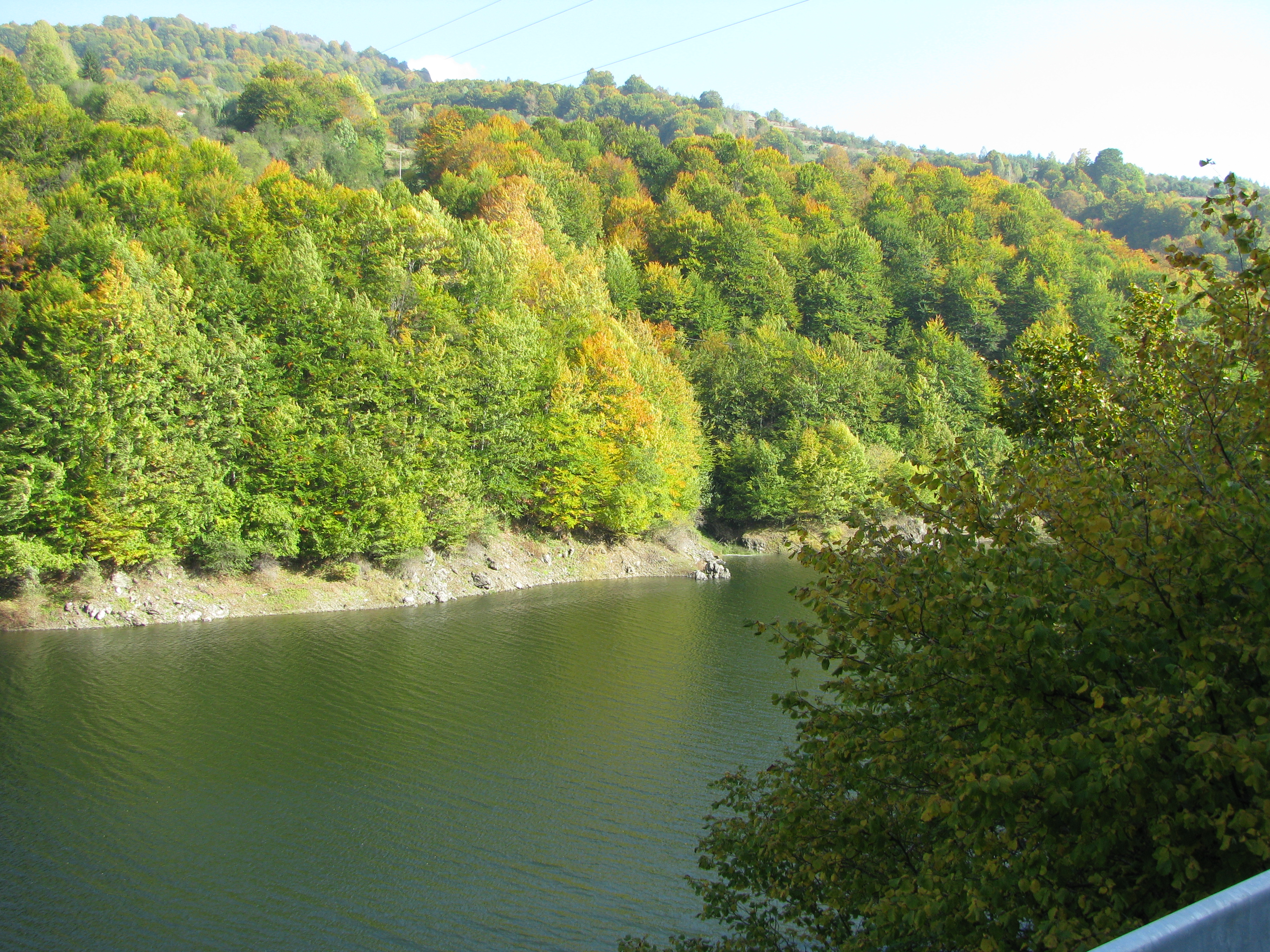
Lisinsko jezero (Lisina reservoir)

== See also ==
- Bulgarians in Serbia
- Dimitrovgrad
- National Council of the Bulgarian National Minority
- Toplica Uprising
- Tsaribrod
- Western Outlands
