= Radičevci =

Radičevci Радичевци
- Village (Selo)
- Location within Serbia
- Country: Serbia
- Region: Southern and Eastern Serbia
- District: Pčinja
- Municipality: Bosilegrad

Population (2002)
  - Total: 164
- Time zone: UTC+1 (CET)
  - Summer (DST): UTC+2 (CEST)

Radičevci (Serbian Cyrillic: Радичевци) is a village in the municipality of Bosilegrad, Serbia. According to the 2002 census, the town has a population of 164 people.

== Demography ==
| Year | 1948 | 1953 | 1961 | 1971 | 1981 | 1991 | 2002 | 2011 |
| Population | 239 | 183 | 149 | 175 | 182 | 180 | 164 | 154 |
