= Resen (Bosilegrad) =

Resen Ресен
- Village (Selo)
- Location within Serbia
- Country: Serbia
- Region: Southern and Eastern Serbia
- District: Pčinja
- Municipality: Bosilegrad

Population (2002)
  - Total: 81
- Time zone: UTC+1 (CET)
  - Summer (DST): UTC+2 (CEST)

Resen (Serbian Cyrillic: Ресен) is a village in the municipality of Bosilegrad, Serbia. According to the 2002 census, the town has a population of 81 people.
