= Bor Lake =

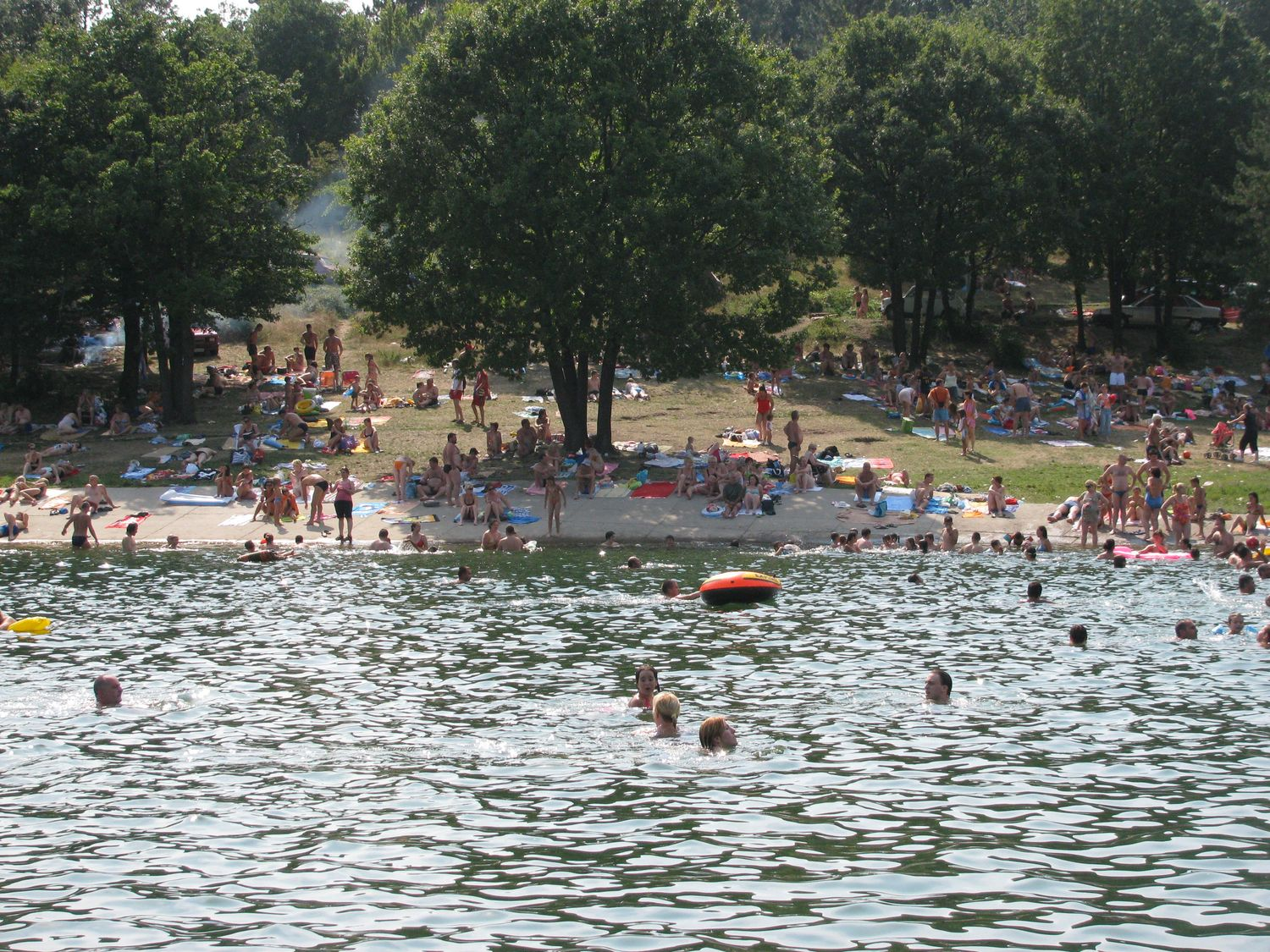
- Borsko Jezero (Bor Lake)

- Location within Serbia
- Location: Bor District, Serbia
- Coordinates: 44.092932°N 22.012555°E
- Lake type: artificial lake
- Surface area: 30 ha (74 acres)
- Max. depth: 48 m (157 ft)
- Surface elevation: 438 m (1,437 ft)
- Frozen: During winter
- Settlements: (at less than 20 km) Bor

Bor Lake (Serbian: Борско језеро / Borsko jezero) is an artificial lake in eastern Serbia (Bor District), at an altitude of 438 m (1,437 ft), less than 20 km (12 mi) from the city of Bor, 248 km (154 mi) and 3 hr 12 minutes away from south east from Belgrade. It is on the road from Bor to Žagubica. Hotels and country houses are built around Lake Bor, since it is a tourist attraction.

The lake is a result of the construction of a dam of the rivers Valja Dzoni, Marec and part of Zlot (Zlotska reka) which took place in 1959 for the operation of the mining and smelting company RTB Bor (Rudarsko topioničarski basen Bor DOO). It has a surface area of around 30 hectares (74 acres). The lowest depth of the water is 48 m (157 ft). It is surrounded by forests. On its shores there is one hotel and one camping. It is popular in the summer, when the water temperature reaches 25 °C (77 °F) and it has two beaches. There are also winter activities in the area, such as skiing in the close by facilities of the Crni Vrh mountain. Other attractions in the area are the Brestovac Spa, the Stol mountain, Crni Vrh, Lazar's cave, Lazar's Canyon, Vratna Gates, Bor Zoo and the Gornjak monastery.

== Gallery ==
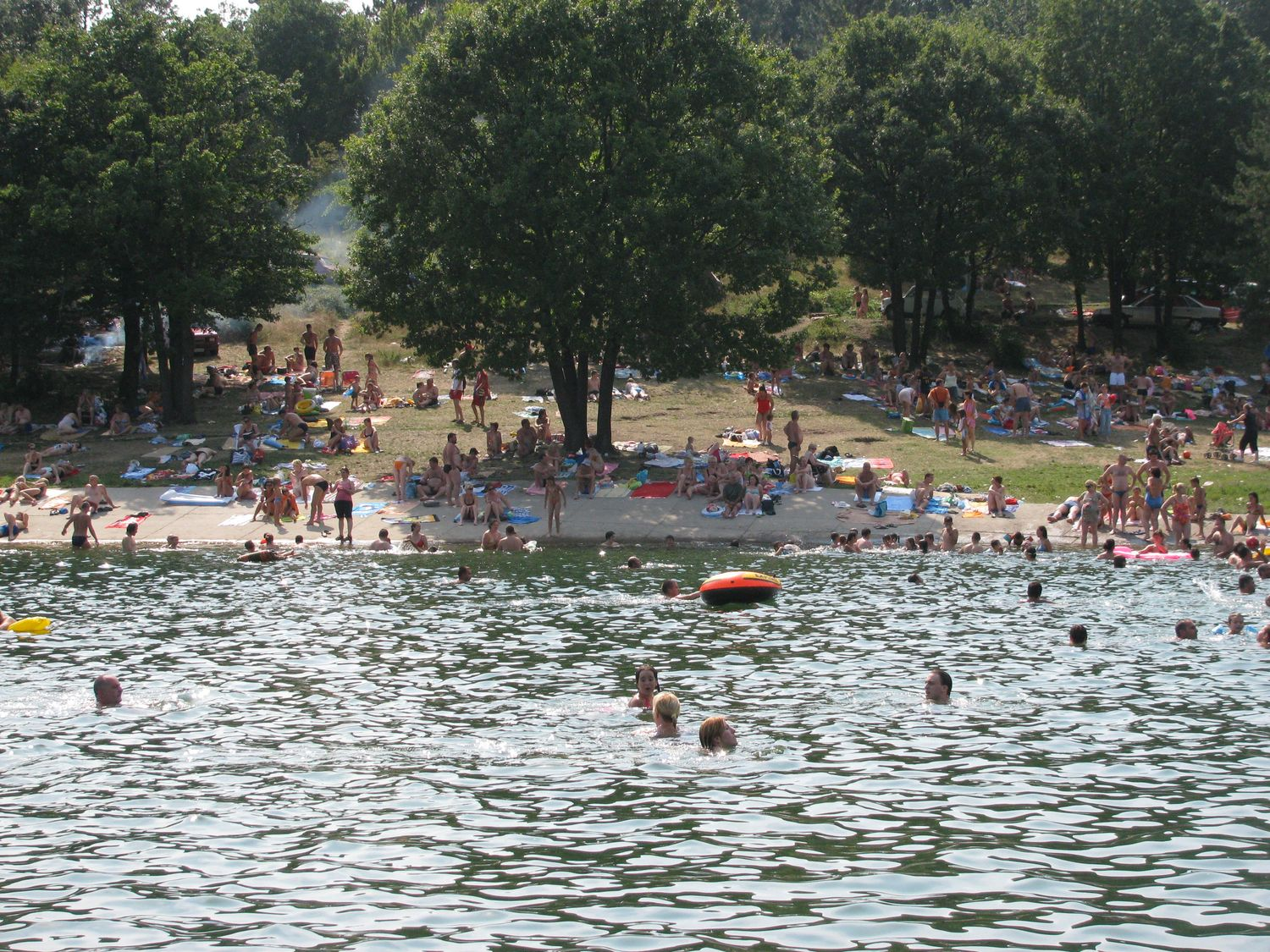

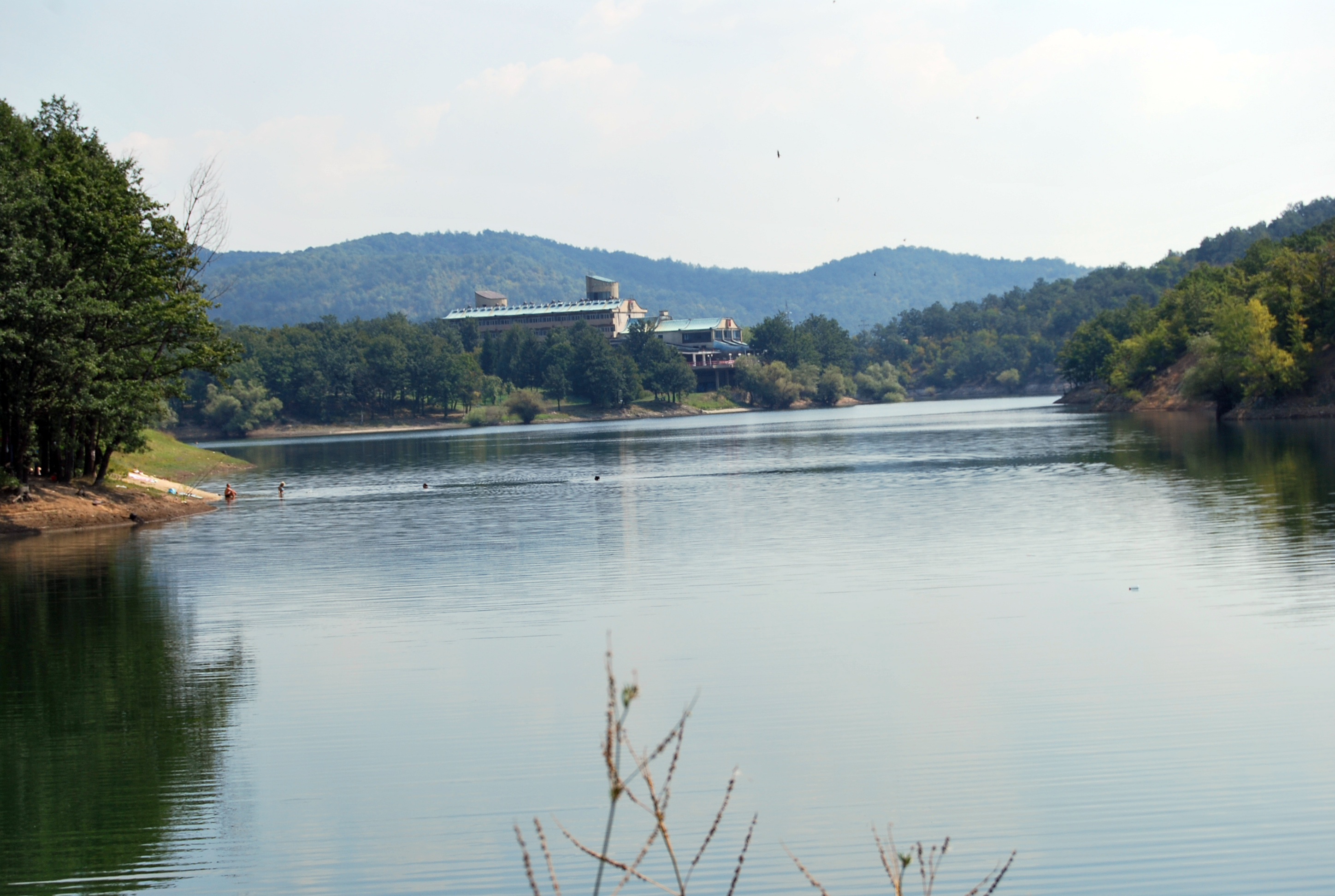

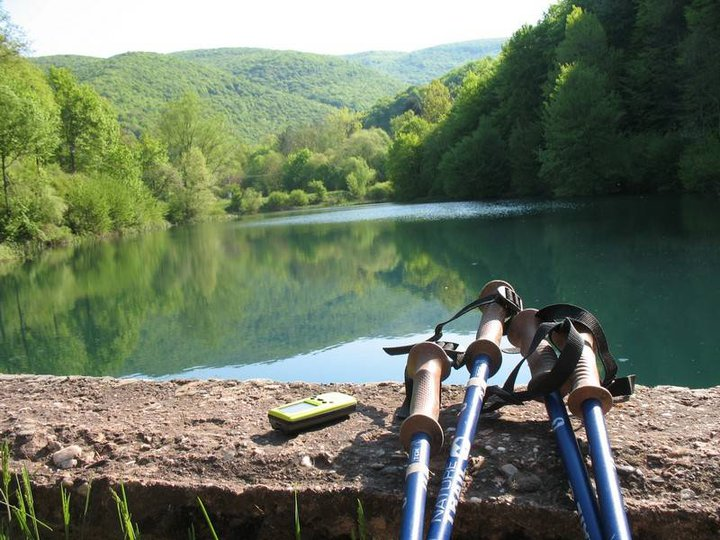

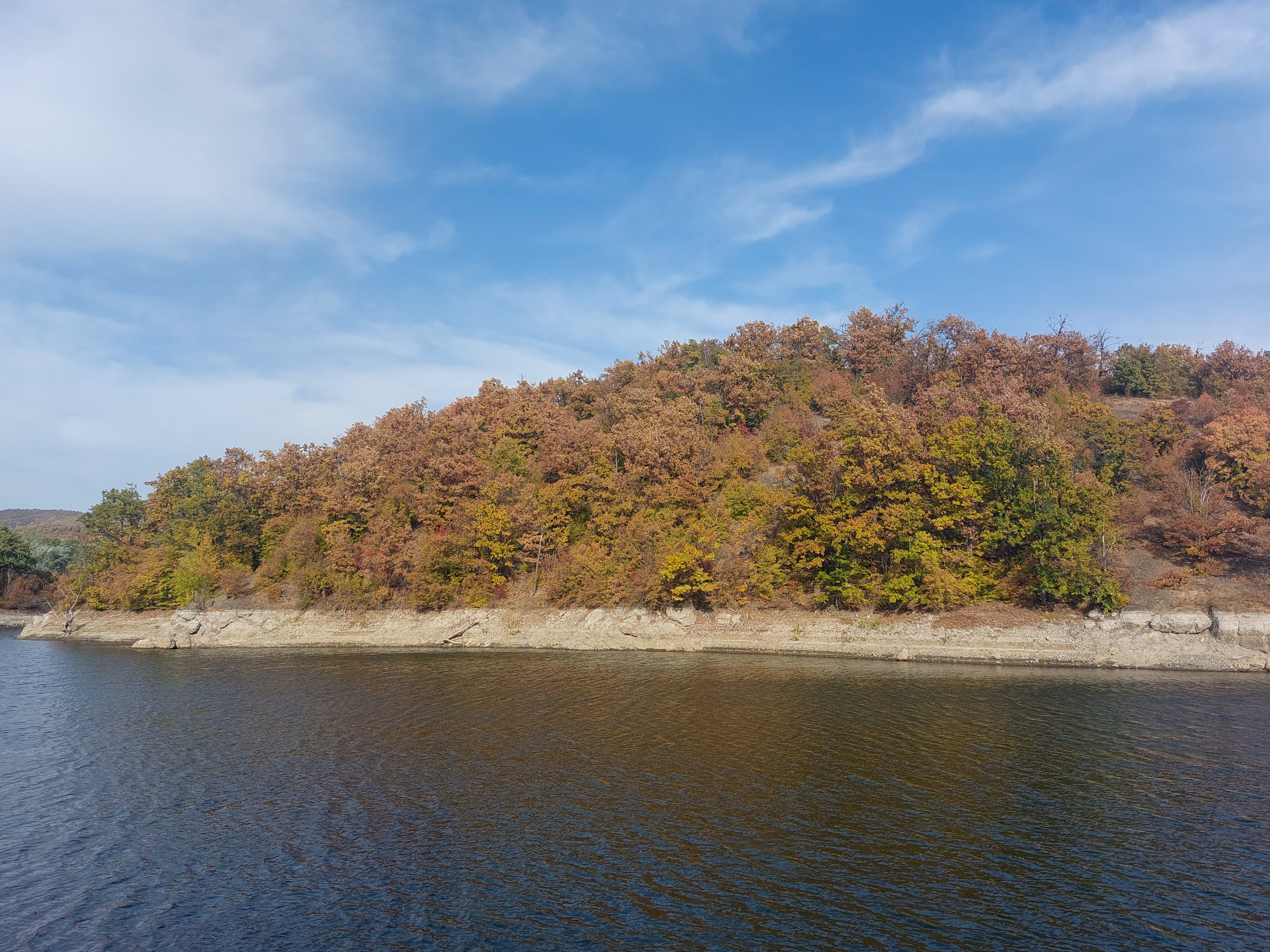
Bor lake in autumn.

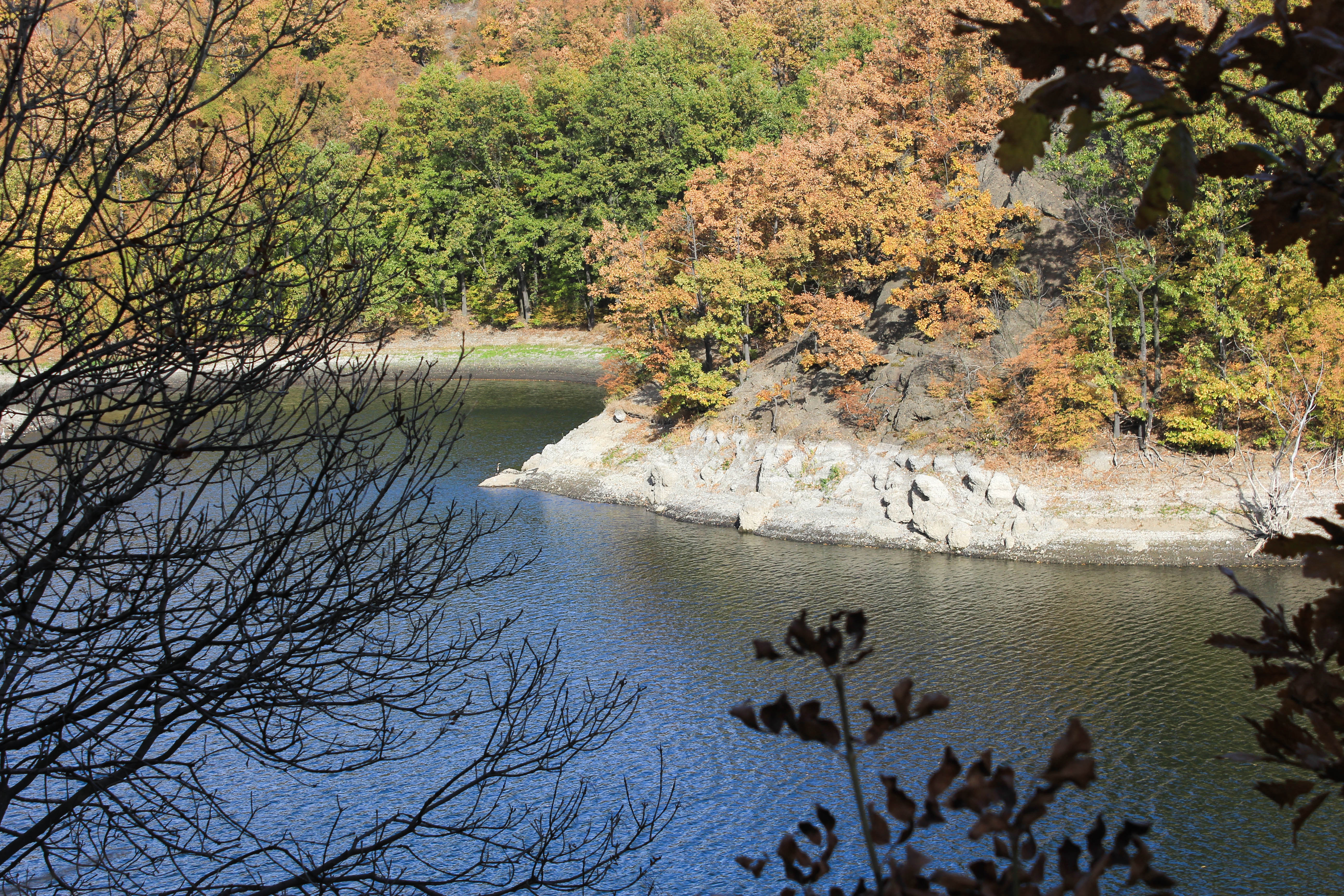
Bor lake in autumn.

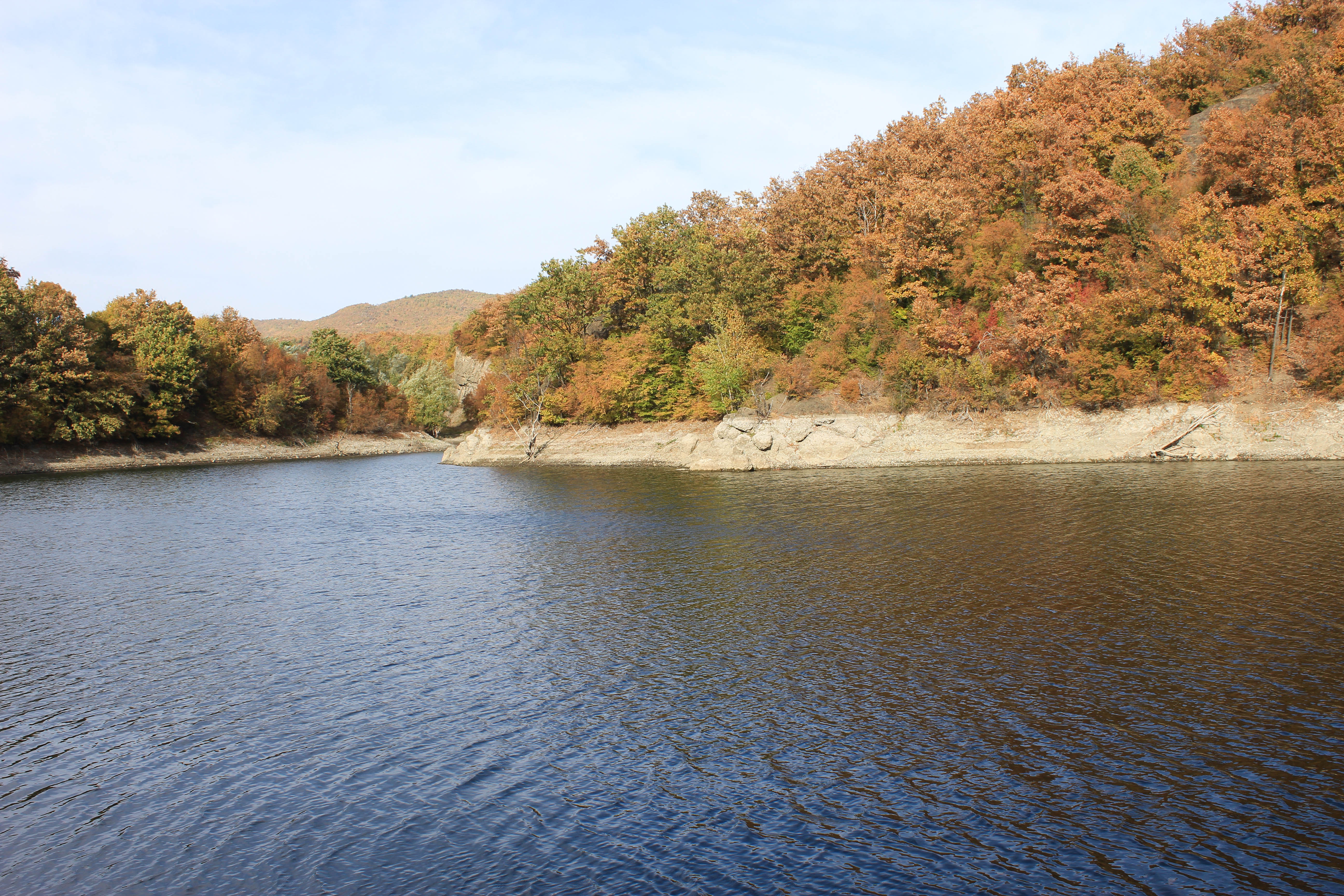
Bor lake in autumn.

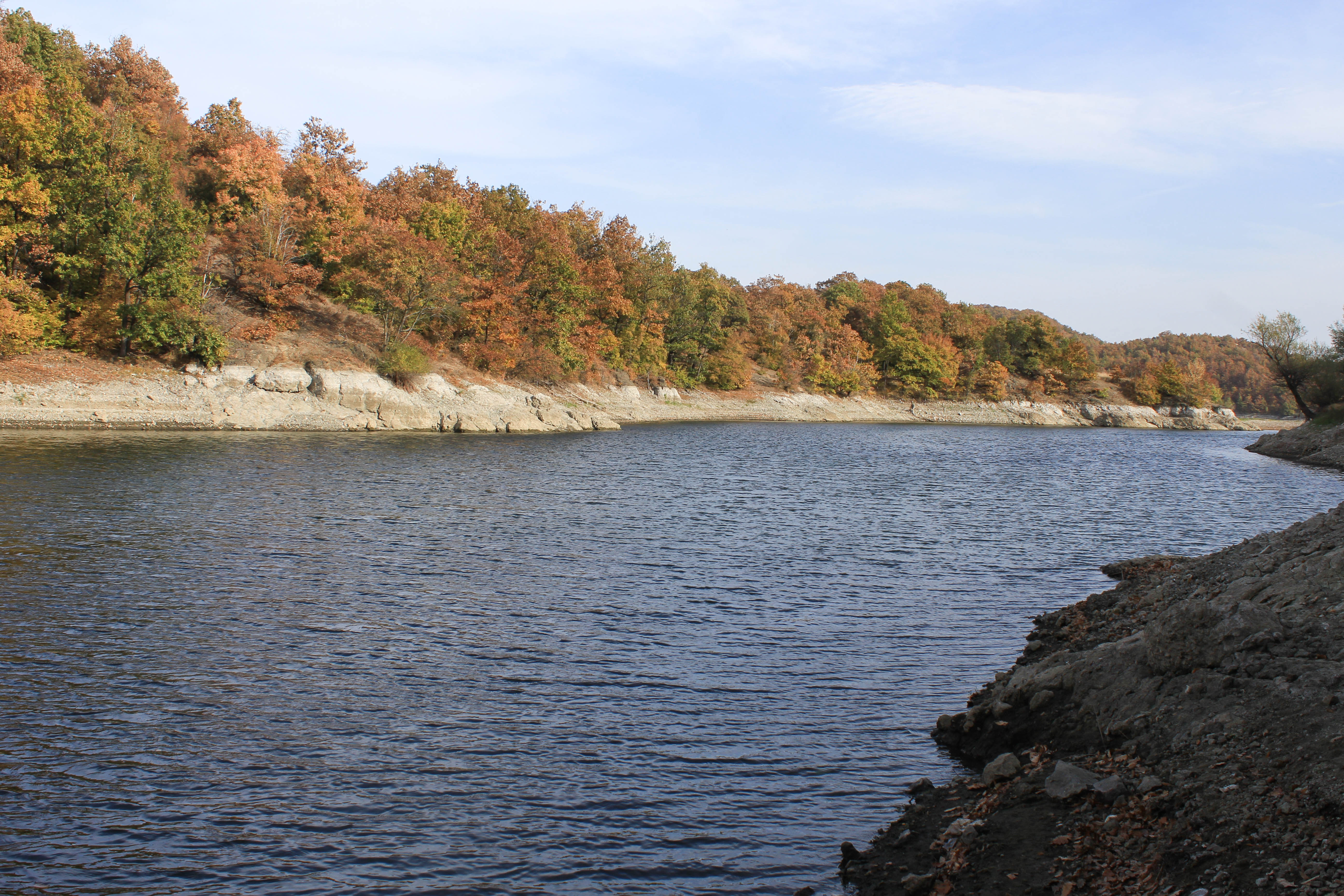
Bor lake in autumn.

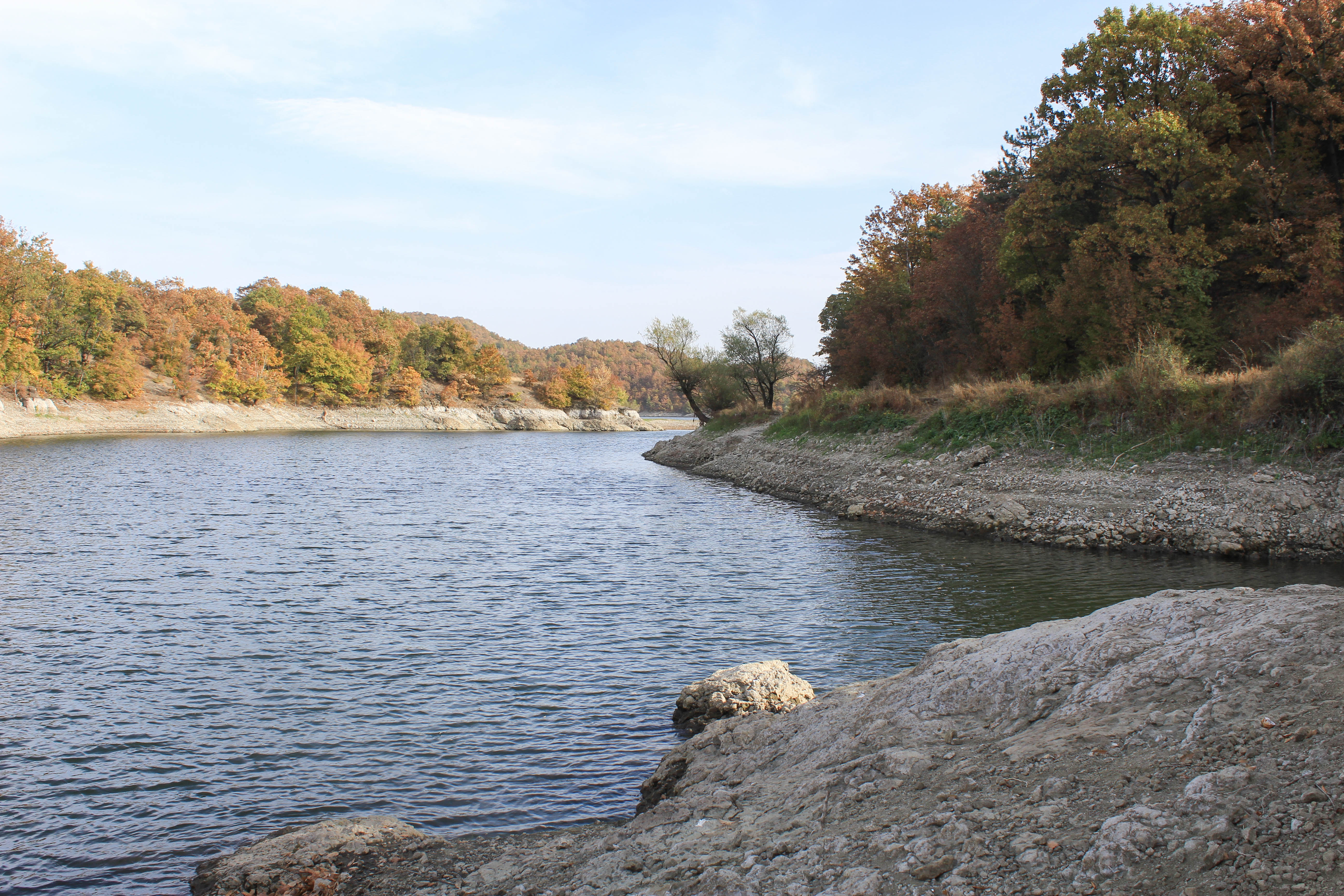
Bor lake in autumn.

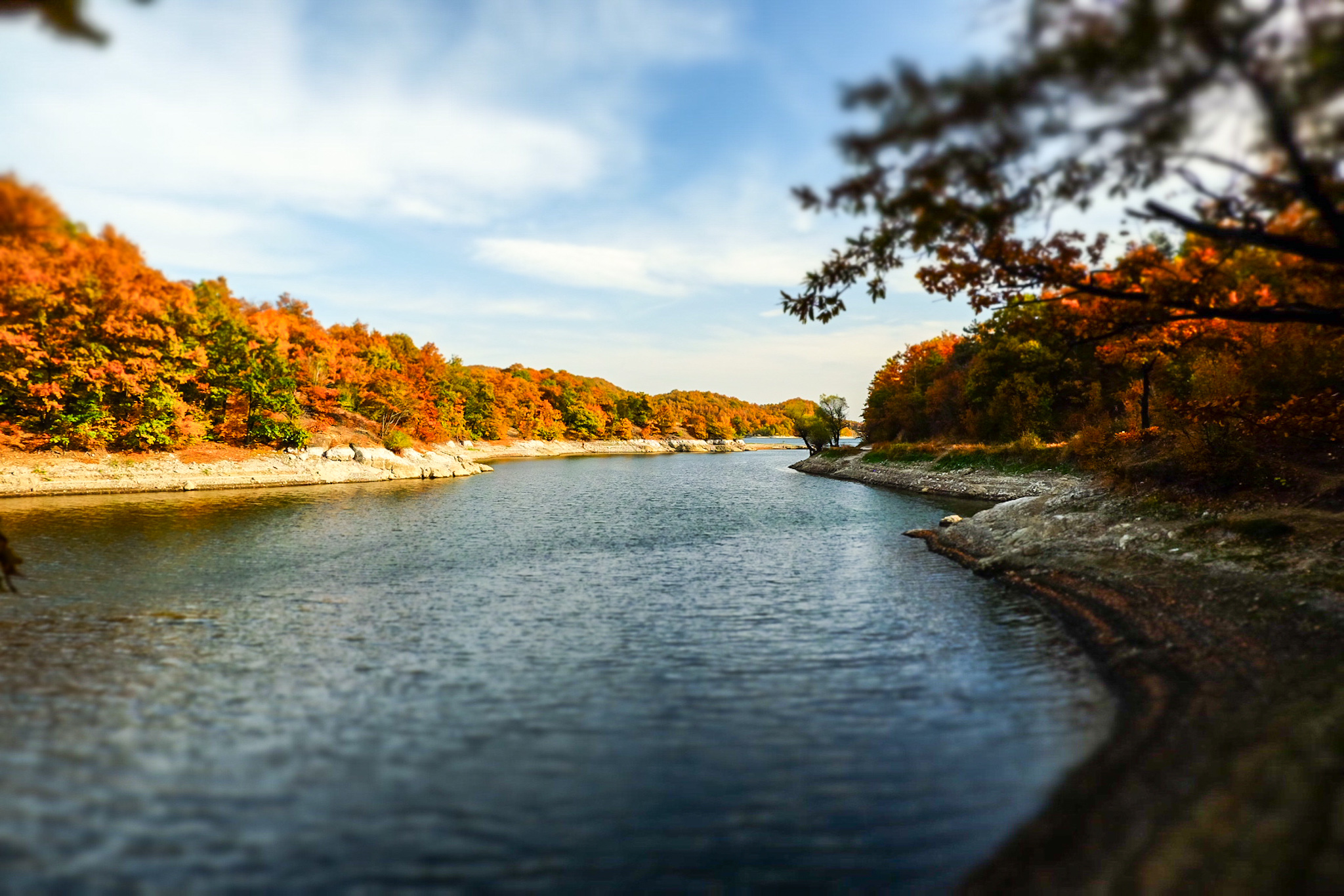
Bor lake in autumn.

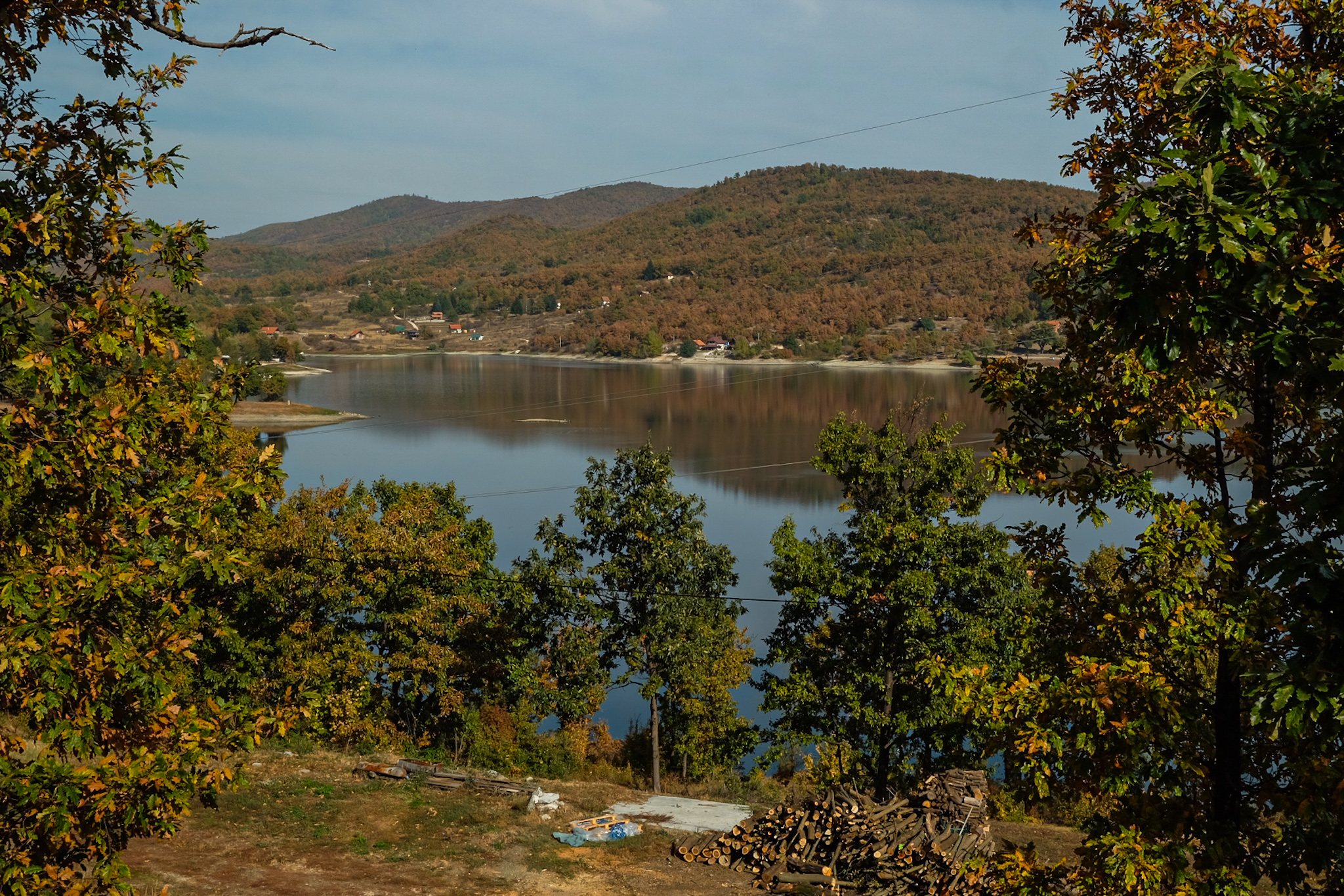
Bor lake in autumn.
