= Cerje Cave =

Cave in Serbia

Coordinates: 43.430126°N 21.939822°E

Cerje Cave or Cerjanka (Serbian: Церјанска пећина, romanized: Cerjanska pećina) is a cave in southeast Serbia. With the length of 7,149 m (23,455 ft), it is the second longest cave in Serbia after the 9,818 m (32,211 ft) long Lazar's Cave.

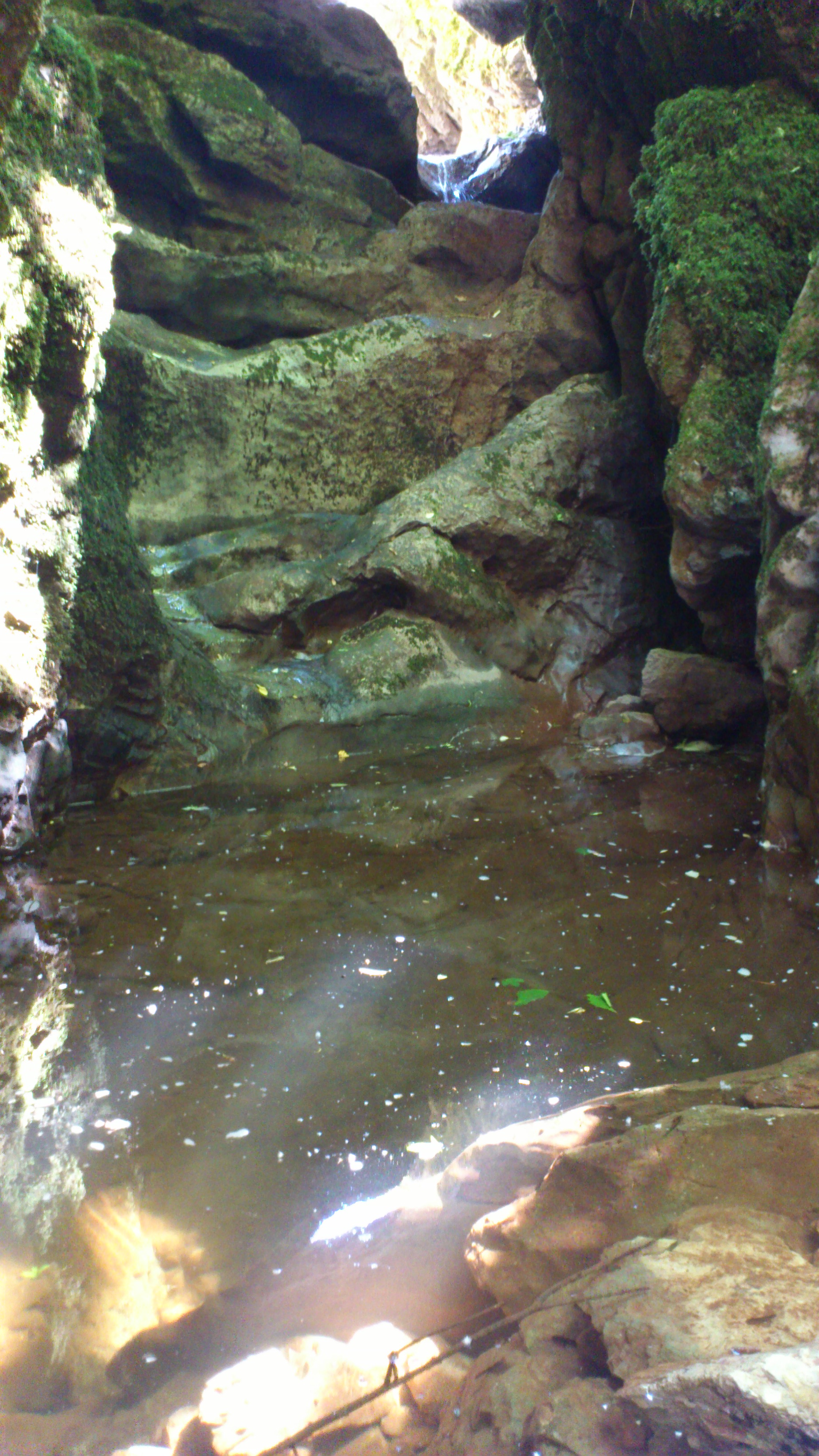
Waterfall at the entrance to the cave

== Location ==
The cave is located 3.5 km (2.2 mi) east of the village of Cerje in the Municipality of Pantelej and 15 km (9.3 mi) north of the City of Niš.

== Geology ==
Entry into the Cerje cave is situated on the western side of the Kalafat mountain, in the wider area of the Kamenički vis plateau. Entrance is located at the point where the river of Provalijska reka sinks underground. The cave itself is hydrologically active. Geologists estimate that the cave is some 2 million years old.

The cave is characterized by the small and narrow entry section and the large dimensions of the Main corridor, which is mostly over 20 m (66 ft), but also up to 30 m (98 ft) high, which points to the different genesis of the two features. Right behind the ending of the low entry section, a large fossil canal was discovered. Today it ends with the plug of blocks, but it is believed that it represents the connection with the old entries into the cave which are now buried under the eroded sides of the amphitheater which marks the ending of the Provalijska reka's blind valley. The Cerje cave is a wet cave. Even during the summer, when the river dries out, there are ponds at the entrance. Further in the cave, the water flows for 3 km (1.9 mi) through the Main corridor, up to the siphon. Other corridors, including the High canal (which is above the central flow), even though they have water in the eroded holes, doesn't seem to have an active water flow. Area of the cave between the siphon and the "Salomna chamber" is called the Moon canal and is carved in the black limestone, eroded into sharp, pointy forms. Eroded water holes are everywhere and the upper sections of almost all corridors, even those deep in the cave, are abundant in allogenic pebblestone and gravel which remained in the niches. It shows that the entire cave was once filled with the allogenic material which was later washed away. Geology had to be different at that time as the modern topography and hydrography in the surrounding area of the cave does not point to the river flow so powerful to wash away the cave. Ceiling of the cave is partially made of an unusual mass which has an appearance of the decomposing limestone. Microscopic analysis showed that the limestone used to be altered by the thermal waters. Today, there are several thermal springs at the foothills, 5 km (3.1 mi) west of the cave, but the role of these thermal springs in the formation of the cave has still to be explored.

The cave was explored for the first time in 1976 by the members of the Belgrade Mountaineering Union when it was established that the cave was 4,240 m (13,910 ft) long which, at the time, made it the longest cave in Serbia. Plans were made to turn it into a touristic attraction so the narrow entrance was widened by the explosives and the silt brought by the Provalijska reka was removed. However, the job of turning it into the touristic destination was never achieved. Since the 1970s, the river has washed away the beams which were placed in 1976 to function as the bridges and again brought silt which turned the entrance into the narrow passage, up to 0.5 m (1 ft 8 in) high, that can only be passed by crawling. Thought to be completely explored, the cave was left unattended until the fall of 1995 when the members of the Student speleologic and alpinistic club (ASAK) explored the cave again and discovered that there is an extension to the main corridor. In July 1996 they returned and discovered 900 m (3,000 ft) of new corridors, raising the overall length to 5,190 m (17,030 ft), with the total depth of 173 m (568 ft).

The Provalijska reka, which enters the cave at an altitude of 515 m (1,690 ft), springs again as the well of Kravljansko vrelo at an altitude of 310 m (1,020 ft), 2.8 km (1.7 mi) northwest of the entrance into the Cerje cave. Explorations in 1996 established that the Kravljansko vrelo is 400 m (1,300 ft) away and 34 m (112 ft) beneath the siphons which mark the end of the cave. Dye tracing conducted in the 1970s proved the connection between the cave and the well of Kravljansko vrelo, but members of ASAK wanted to dive through the well to the cave. Due to the technical problems, they had to quit at the depth of 15 m (49 ft).

Another feature which is suspected to be connected to the cave is the pit above the Kravljansko vrelo. It is located at an altitude of 450 m (1,480 ft) and is 123 m (404 ft) deep. In the winter of 1996 ASAK explored the pit again. Strong air drift from the eroded shaft at the bottom of the pit points to the existence of the spacious canal in the pit's extension, which is most likely connected to the Cerje cave. Previous measurements showed that the pit is located right above the cave's "Salomna chamber" which is located at the end of the corridor, as much as it was explored at the time. However, repeated measurements showed that the pit is actually 350 m (1,150 ft) east of the cave's canal and that the pit's bottom is close to the level of the Kravljansko vrelo, below the cave's siphon. A plan was made to dig through the pit's bottom shaft in order to make an easier access to the distant areas of the cave. The pit corridors and the spring are called Gornjekravljansko vrelo or Pećurina.

Explorations in August–September 1998 lengthened the cave's total size to 5,715 m (18,750 ft). A bypass was discovered around the siphon at the then ending of the corridor. New extension is wide and wet and 300 m (980 ft) away from the well of the Kravljansko vrelo. In September 1999, a new attempt of diving through the well followed, but again had to be stopped at the depth of 15 m (49 ft), this time because of the plug made of the sand and silt sediments. It is assumed that during the period of the spring high waters, the plug is probably washed away, establishing connection between the siphon and the well. In October 1999, new corridors were explored and the cave is at the moment 6,025 m (19,767 ft) long, out of which the Main corridor has 3,360 m (11,020 ft). Total depth is 176 m (577 ft). Passages which lead to the extension behind the siphon were widened and the new corridor is named "Via Kravlje". "Via Kravlje" is only 200 m (660 ft) away from the Kravljansko vrelo, but as it ends on both sides with the siphons, further explorations can only be conducted by the speleo divers. At that moment, it was the third longest cave in Serbia after the Lazar's Cave and the Ušak Cave system.

In 2015, new corridors were discovered, and an assumption that they connect the cave with the Kravljansko vrelo was confirmed in December 2016 when the corridors were successfully passed through. The new corridor to Kravljansko vrelo was named the "Houdini passage" and the final feature in it is the Siphon II. In August 2017, the speleologist finally reached what they believe is the end of cave but they also established that the Cerje Cave System consists of the cave (Provalija), the spring of Kravljansko vrelo and the corridors surrounding the Pećurina pit above. A narrow vertical shaft near the small cave lake was also explored, two narrows were widened and the area from the "Chamber of Blocks" to the 40 m (130 ft) high interior ridge was also examined. The explorers wish to continue examination of the cave and to find whether it is connected to another local pit, Cerjanska propast.

With the total measured length of 7,149 m (23,455 ft), it is the second longest cave in Serbia.

== Name ==
Original, local name for the cave was Provalija, after the river which sinks into the cave. Provalija is Serbian for chasm or abyss. Speleologists who explored the cave named it Cerjanka, after the village of Cerje as the cave is located in the village territory. Official name was established as the Cerjanska pećina (Cerje cave).

== Characteristics ==
Varieties of the speleothems that developed in the cave include stalactites, stalagmites, helictites, wave draperies, cave corals and crystal flowers. The cave is especially noted for its helictites or the cave roses, which are actually stalactites that have a central canal with twig-like or spiral projections that appear to defy gravity. They can have many forms and those in Cerje cave are rose-like, as they spread in all directions due to the air currents. Cave roses, like the ones formed in the cave are not found in any other locality in the Balkans.

== Wildlife ==
The cave is abundant in fire salamanders.

== Protection ==
The Cerje cave is under protection since 1955. In 1998, Institute for nature conservation of Serbia declared the cave a natural monument.

In 2013 another plan for the turning of the cave into the touristic attraction was announced. Two mini dams and one bridge were built on the Provalijska reka in order to prevent it from burying the entrance with silt. But as of 2017, the cave is still not open for public.

== Gallery ==
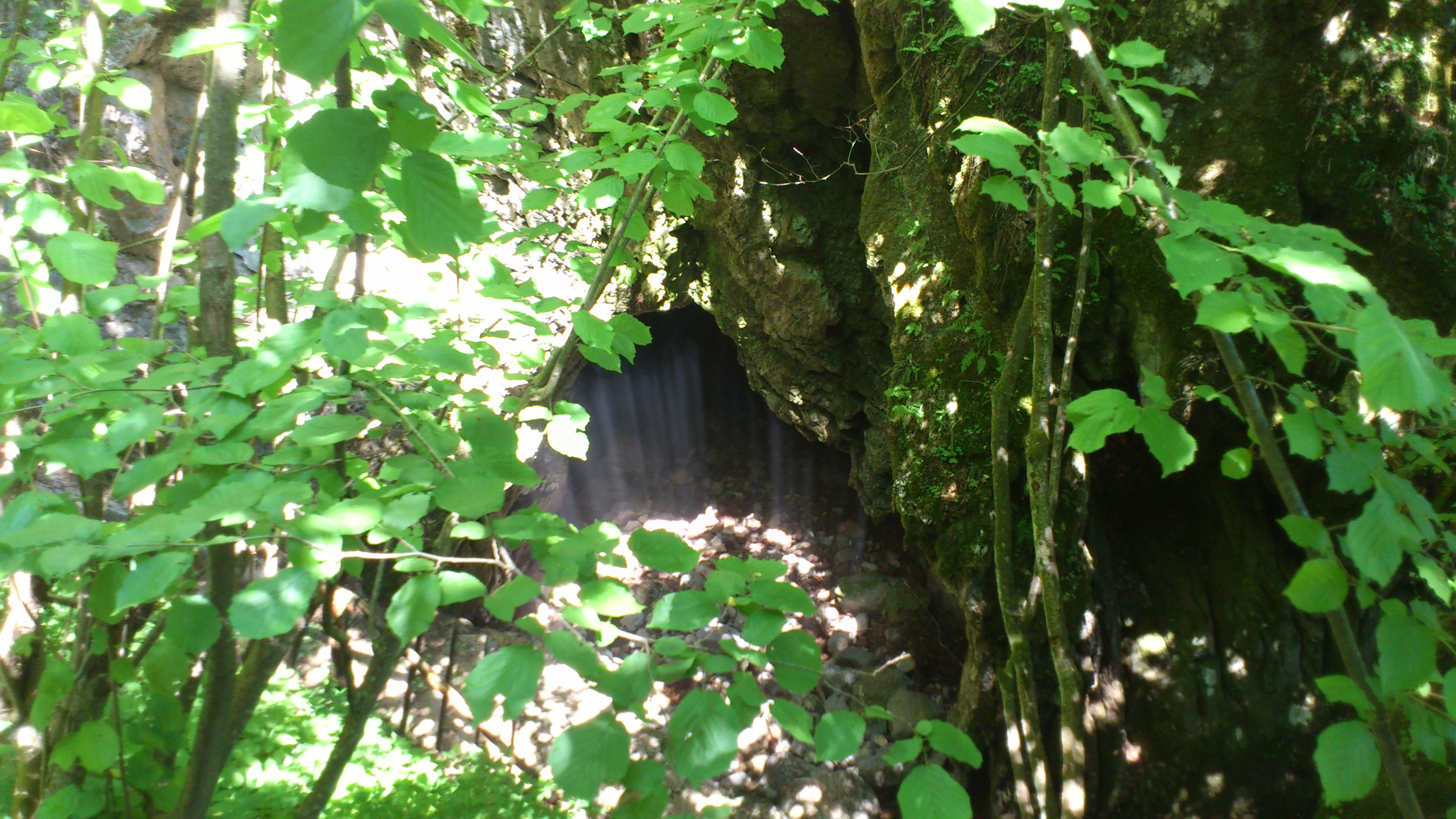
The cave

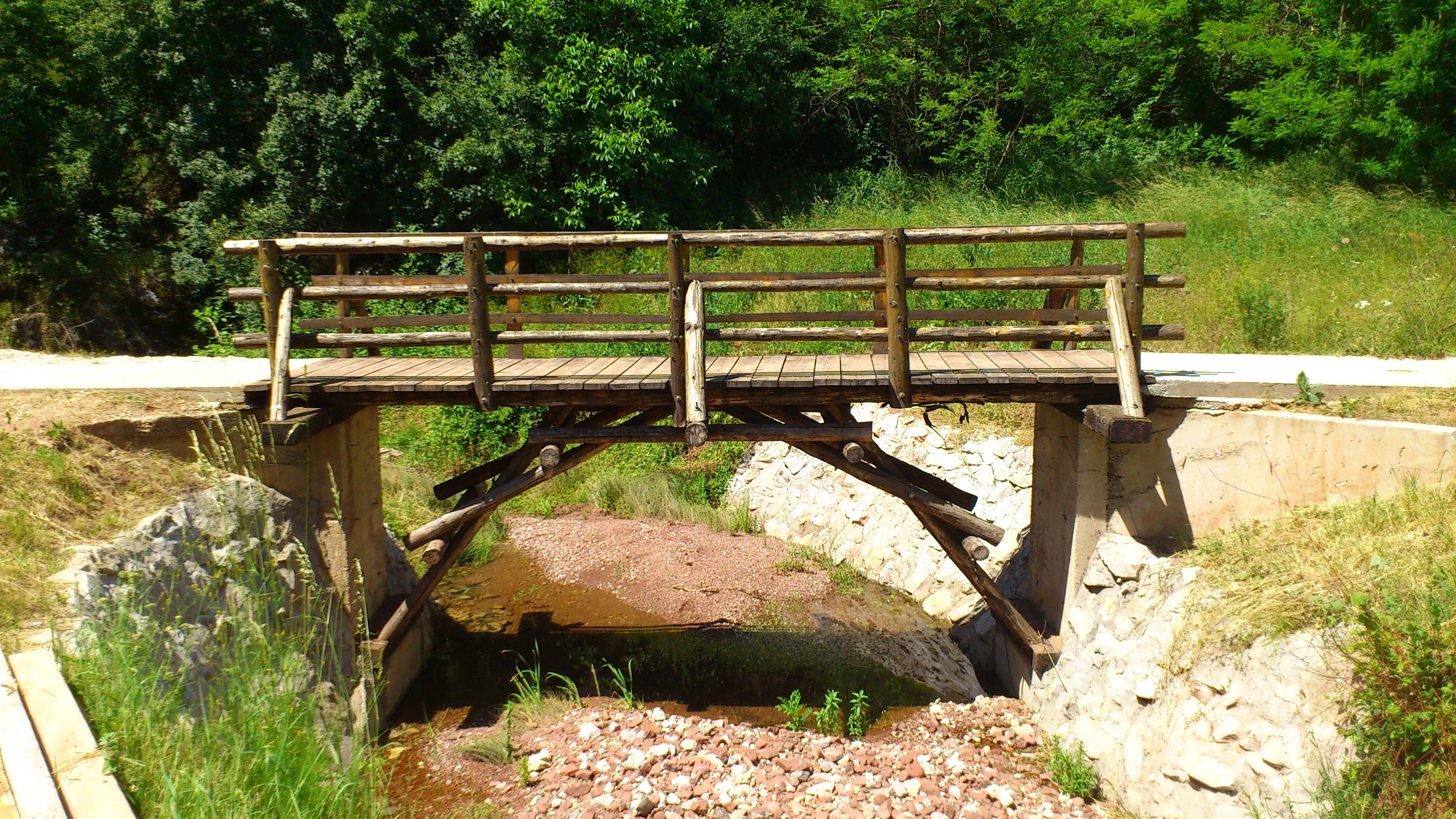
Bridge at the entrance 1

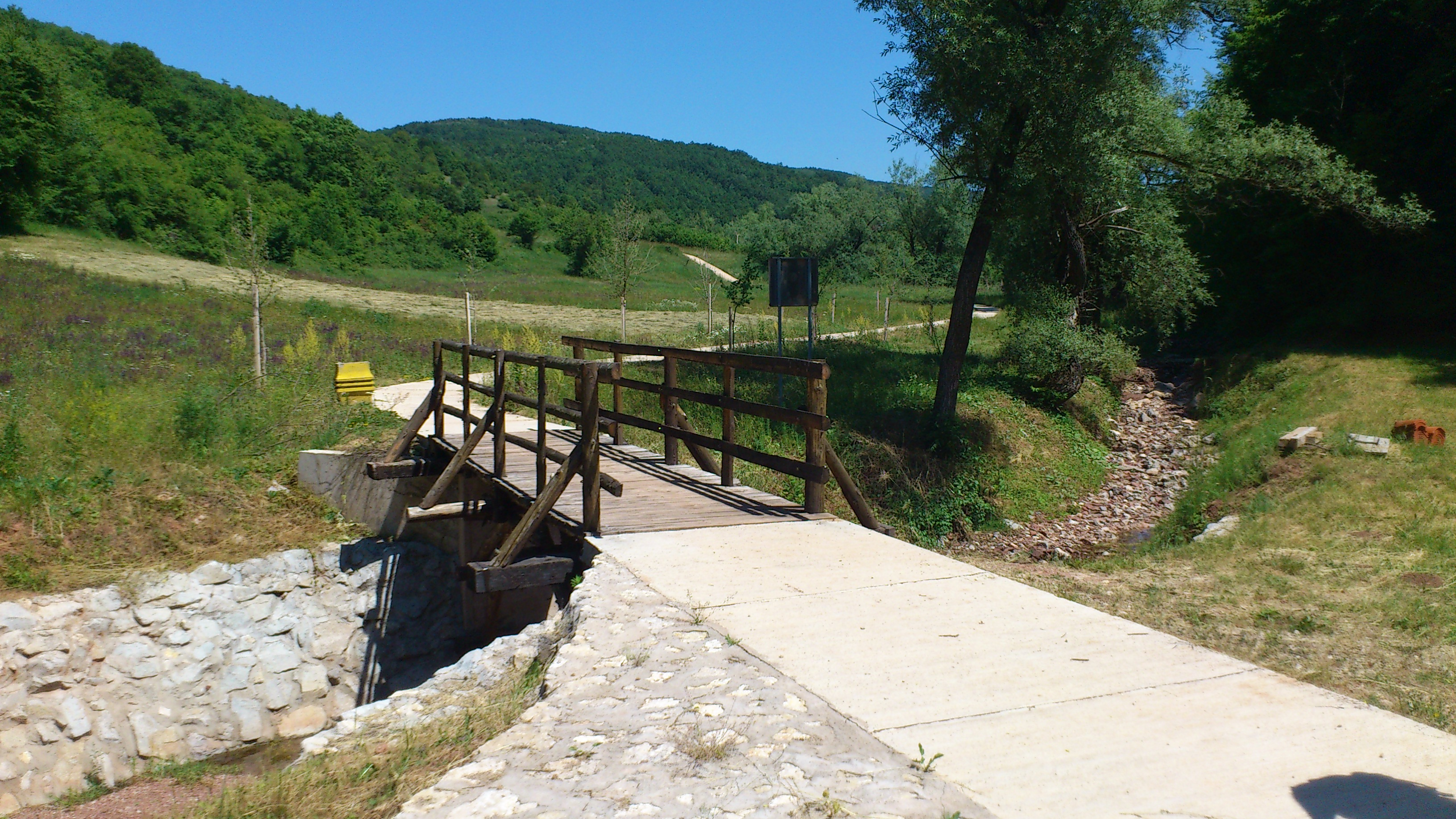
Bridge at the entrance 2

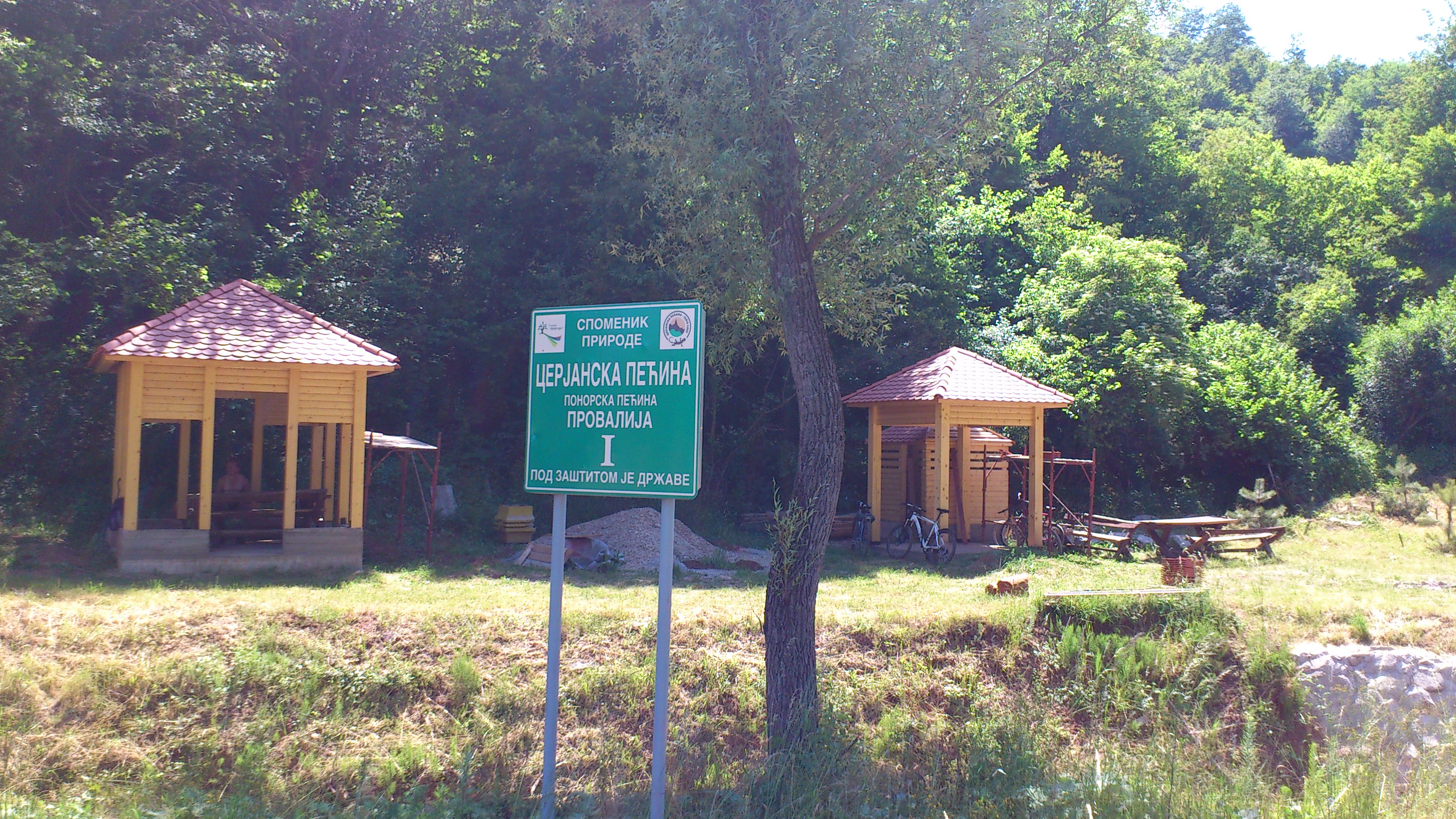
Plaque at the entrance

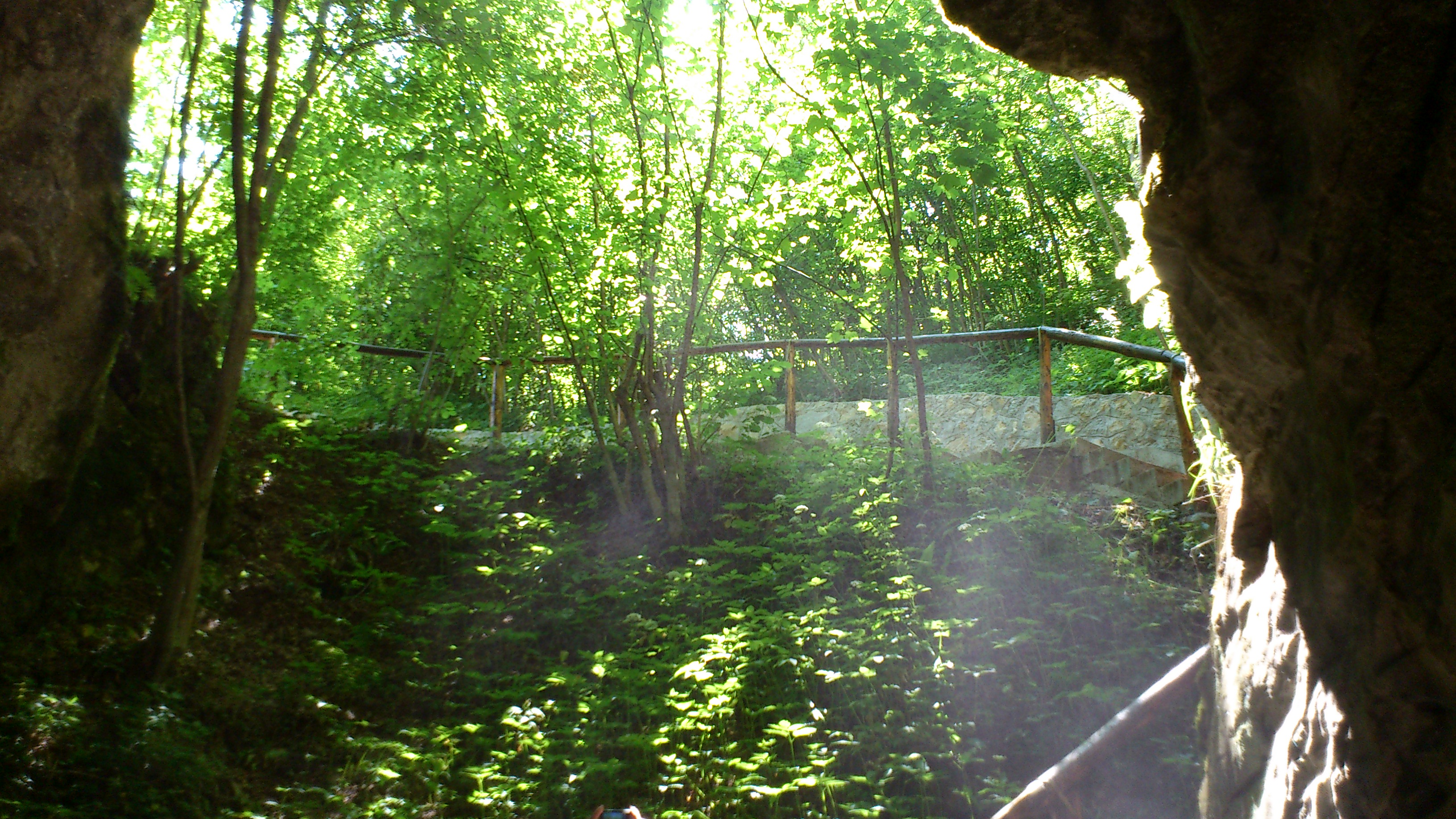
View from the cave

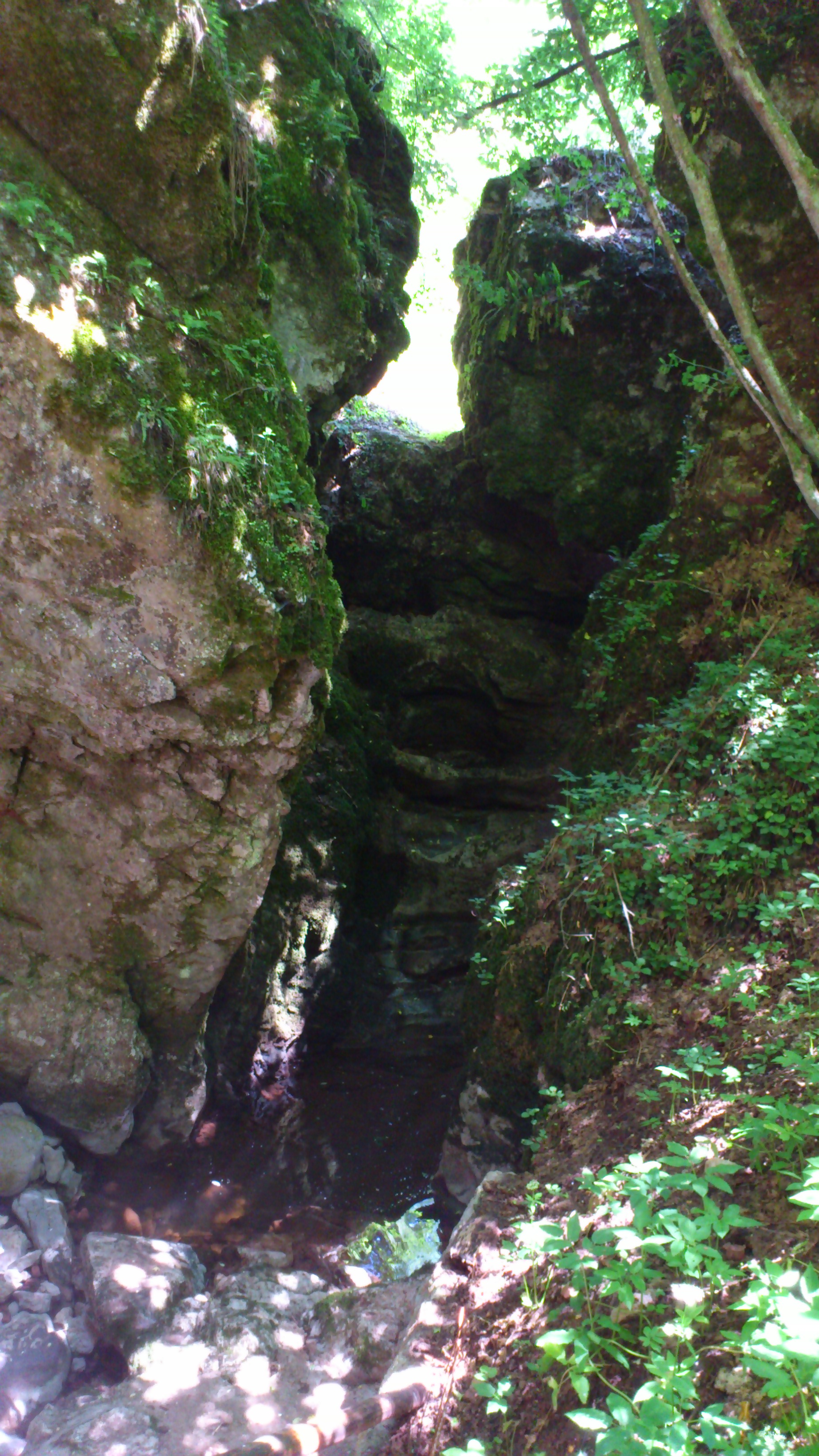
Waterfall near the entrance

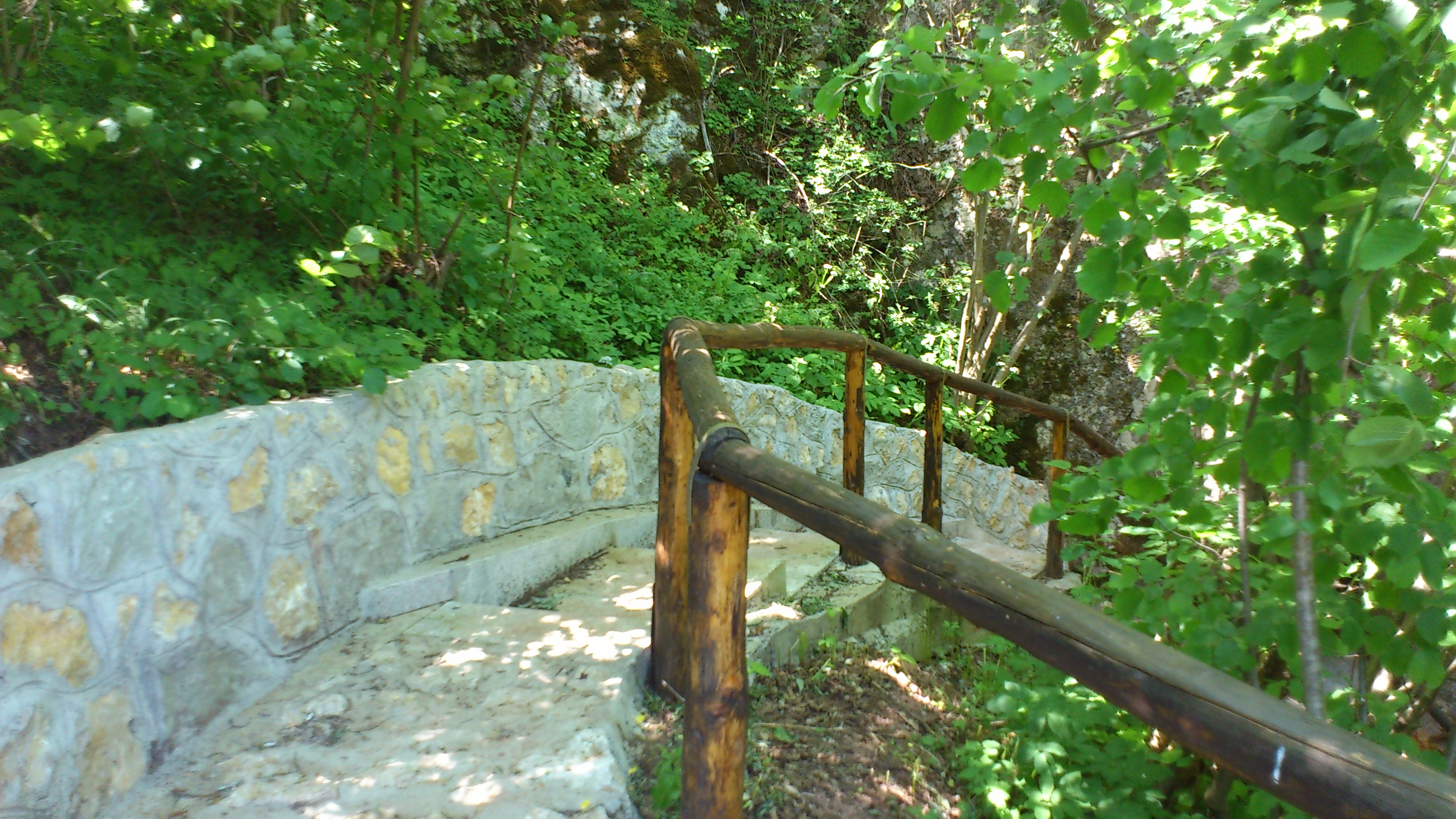
Stairs to the cave
