= Cerje (Niš) =

- Village
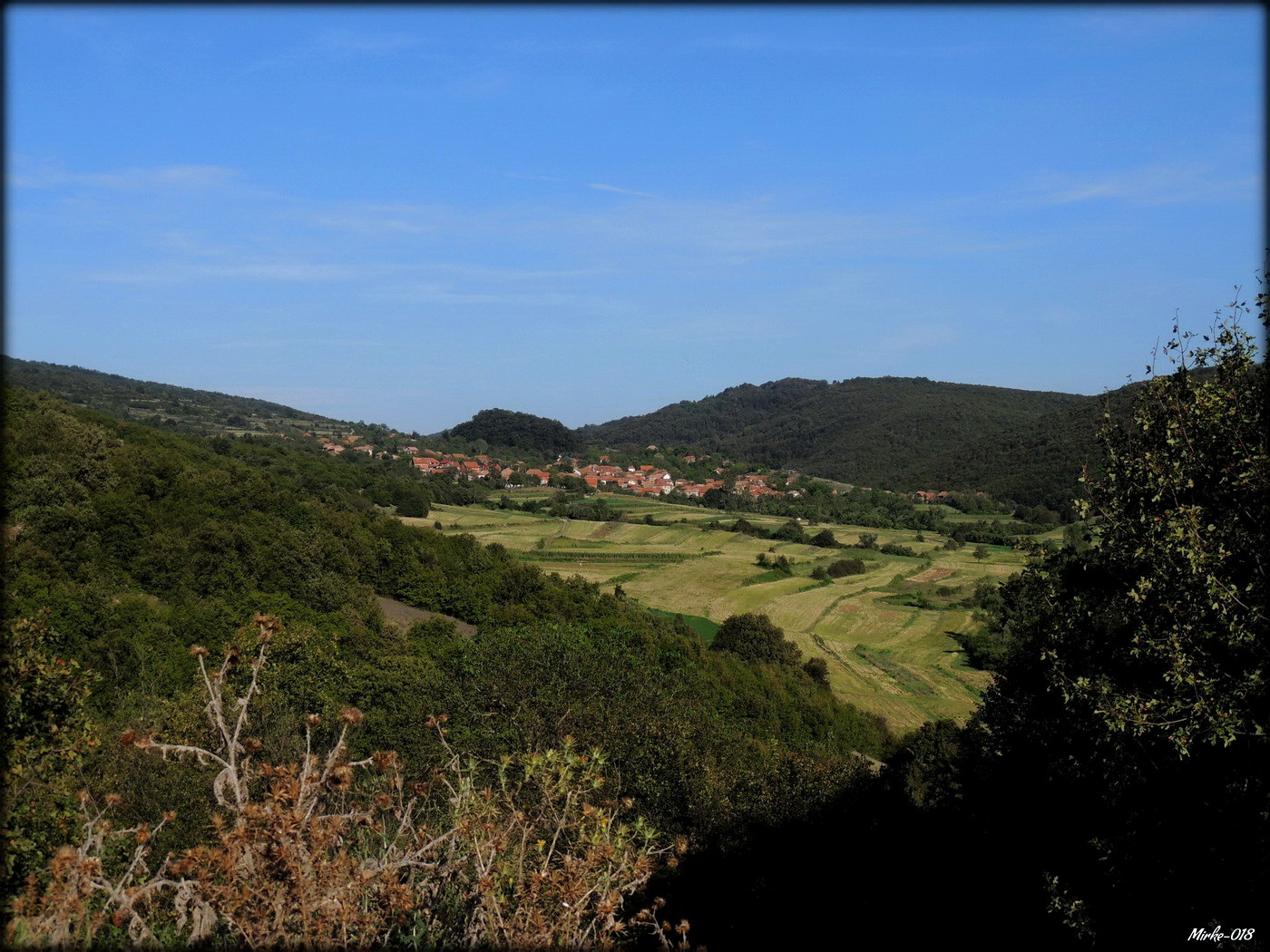

- Location within Serbia
- Country: Serbia
- Region: Southern and Eastern Serbia
- District: Nišava
- City: Niš
- Municipality: Pantelej
- Time zone: UTC+1 (CET)
  - Summer (DST): UTC+2 (CEST)

Cerje is a village situated in Niš municipality in Serbia.

The village is location of the Cerje Cave, which is, with the length of 6,025 m (19,767 ft), the third longest cave in Serbia after the Lazar's Cave and the Ušak Cave system.
