= Petnica Cave =

Serbian cave popular with tourists

Coordinates: 44°14′42.44″N 19°56′8.63″E

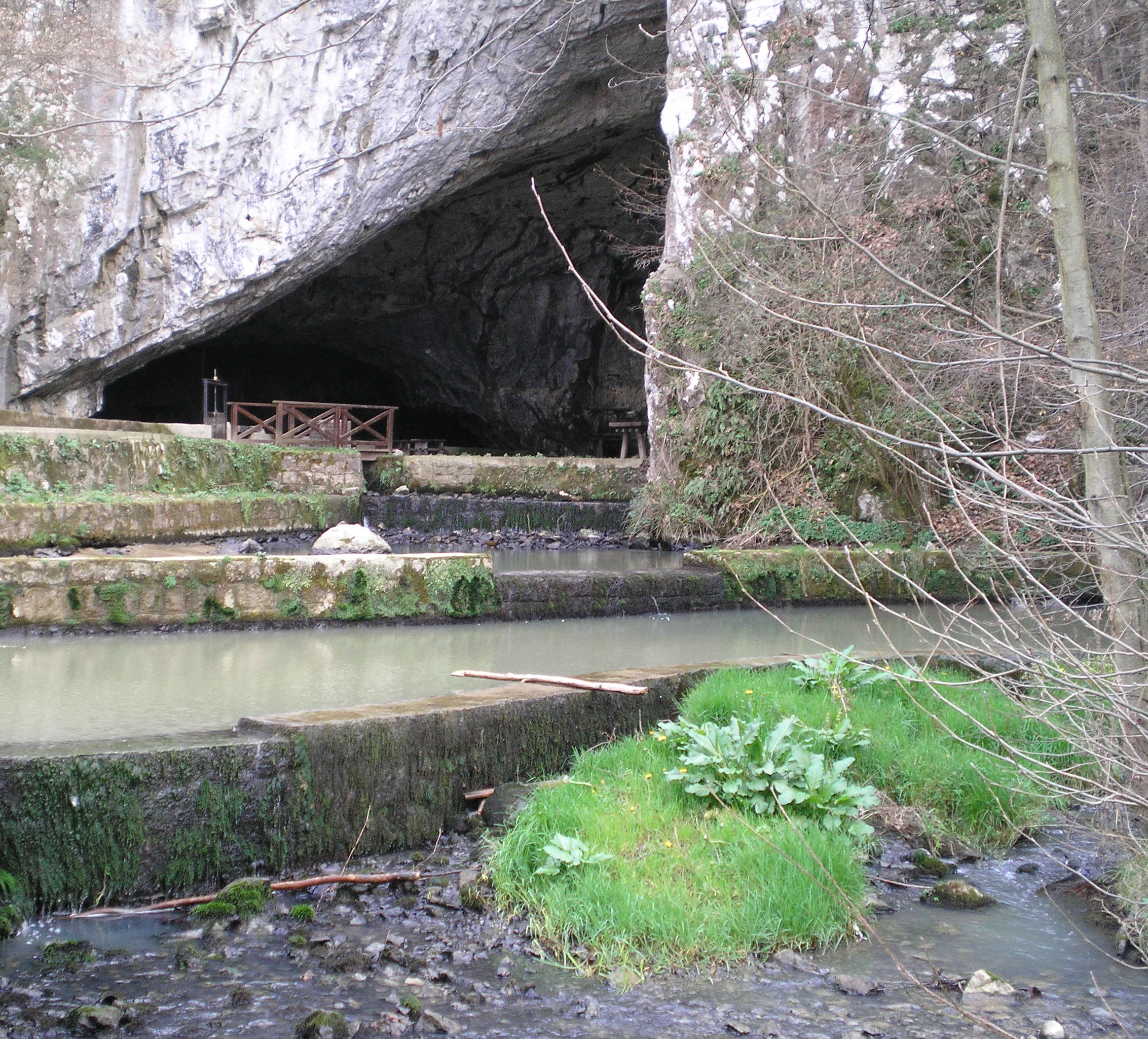
Petnica Cave

Petnica Cave is located in the village of Petnica, near the city of Valjevo, Serbia. The cave has been popular for tourism since at least the 19th century, when it was one of the three most popular caving destinations in Serbia along with Prekonoska and Lazareva Pecina.

== Gallery ==
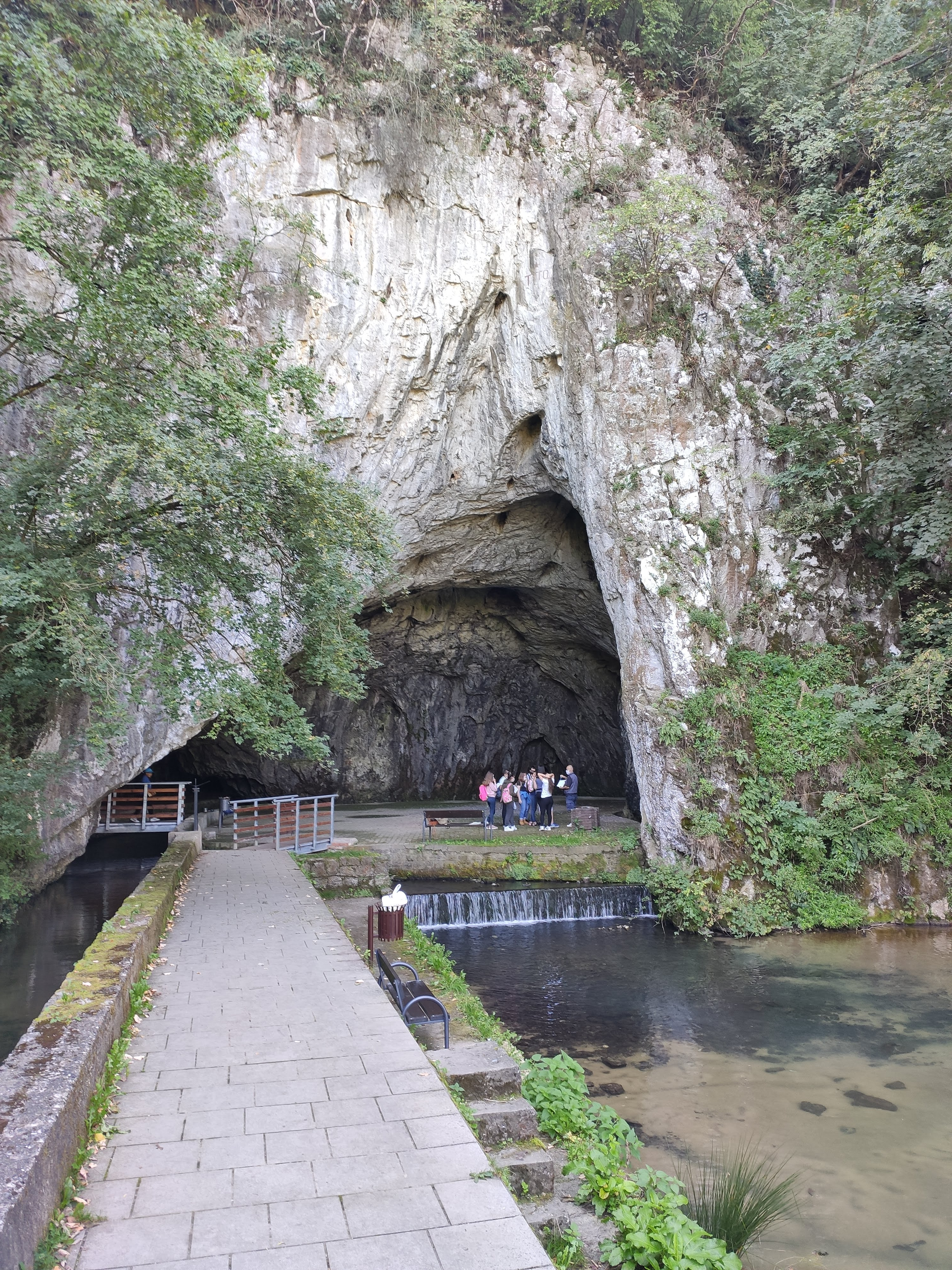

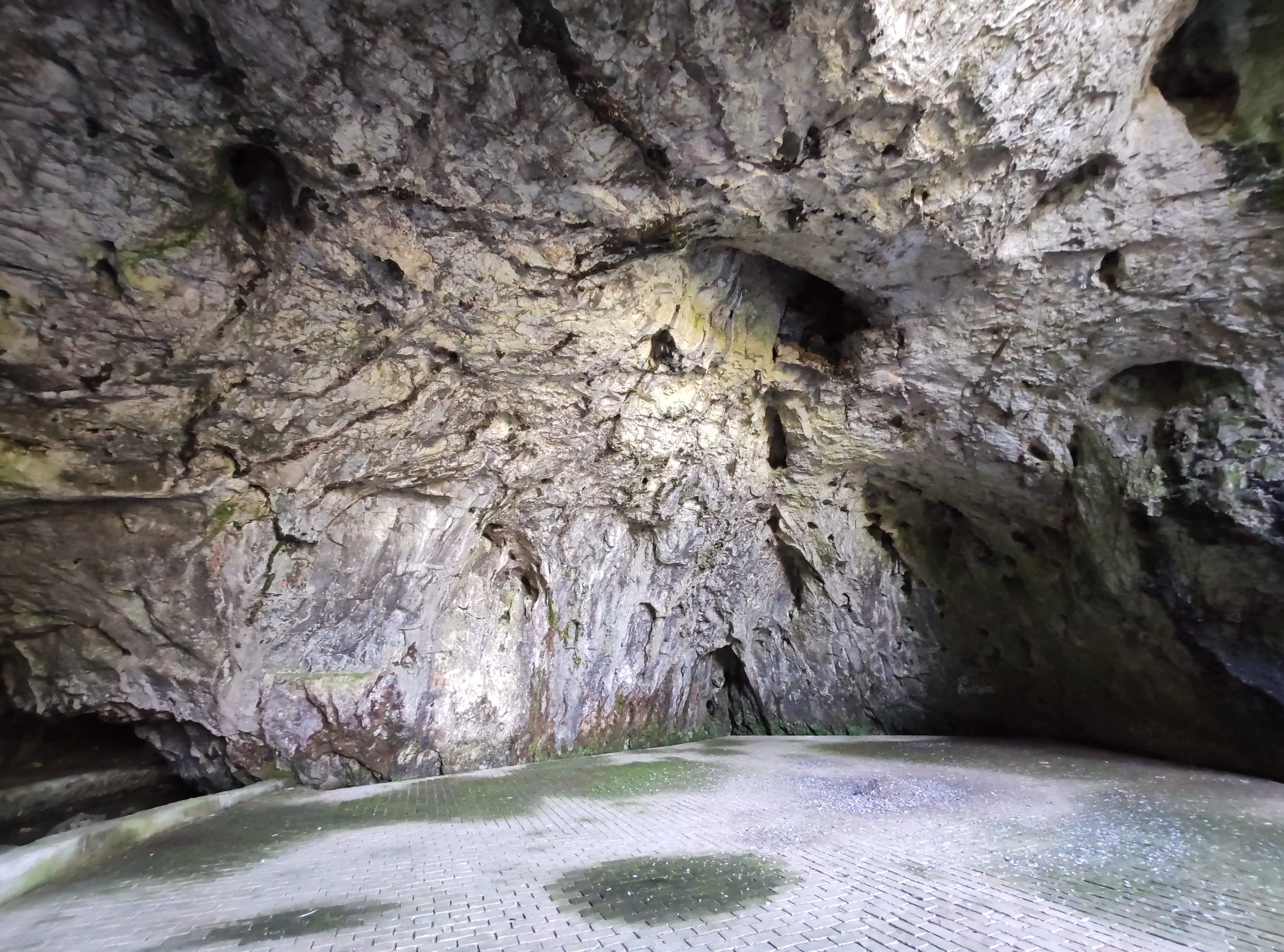

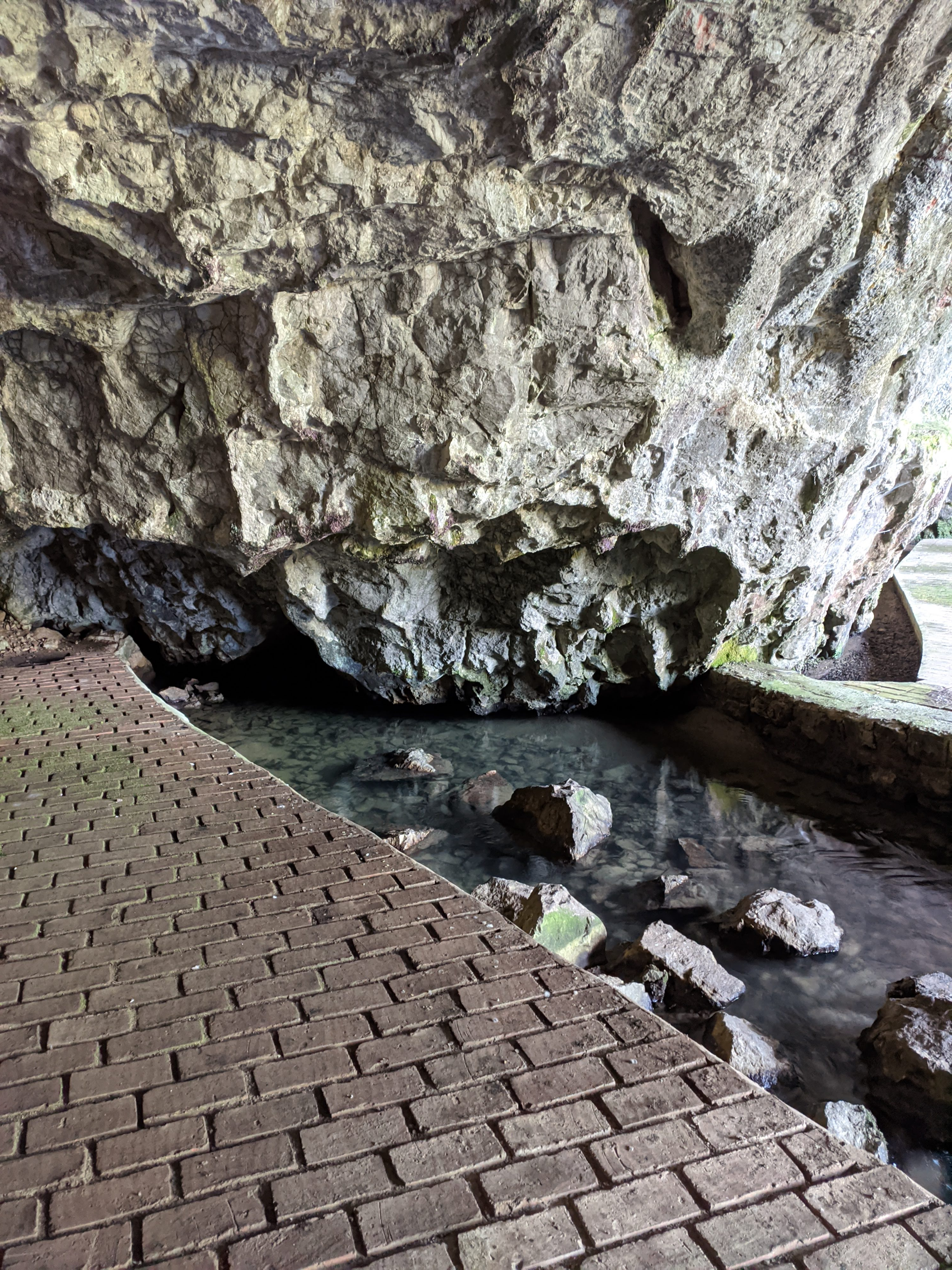

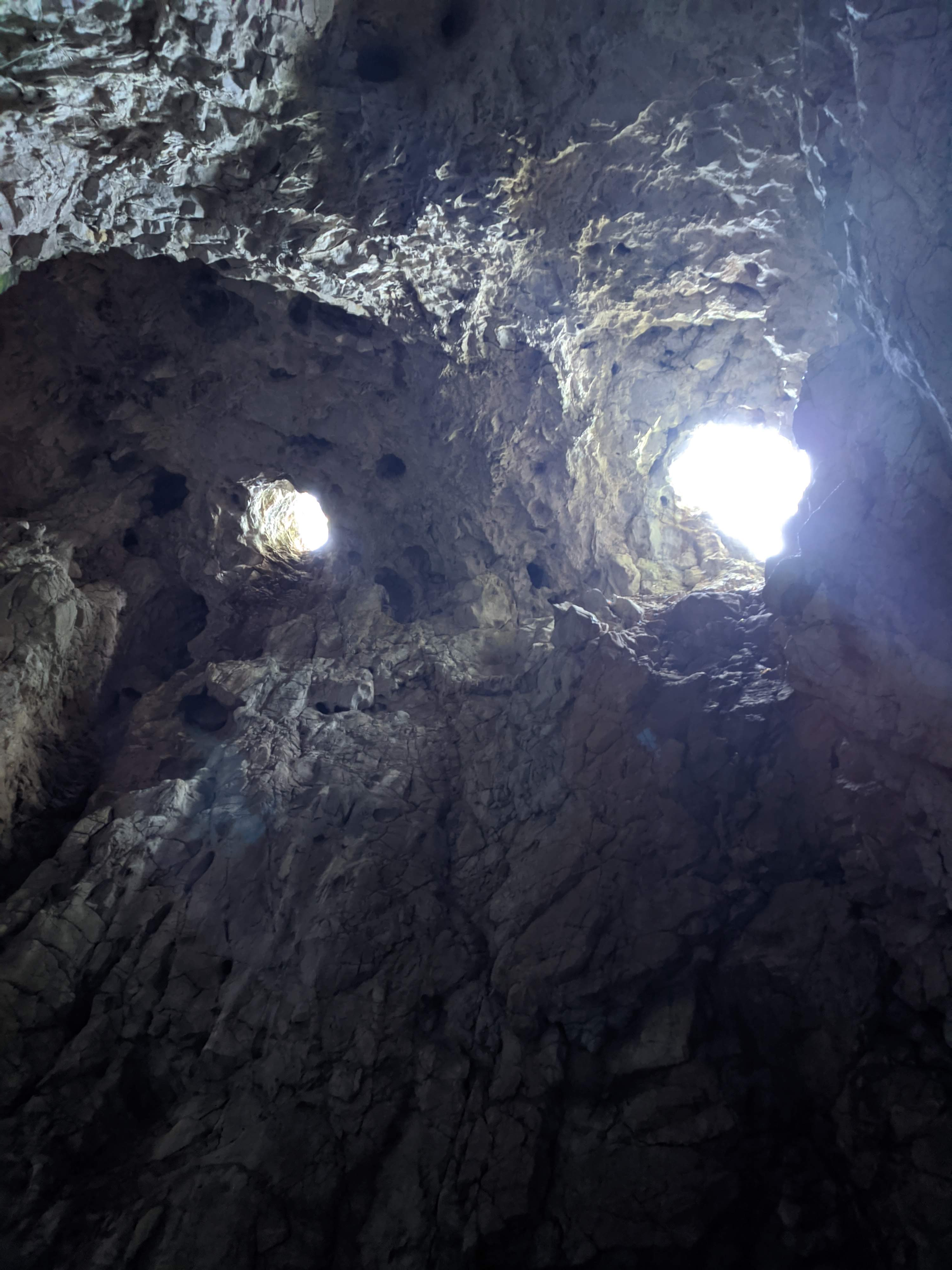

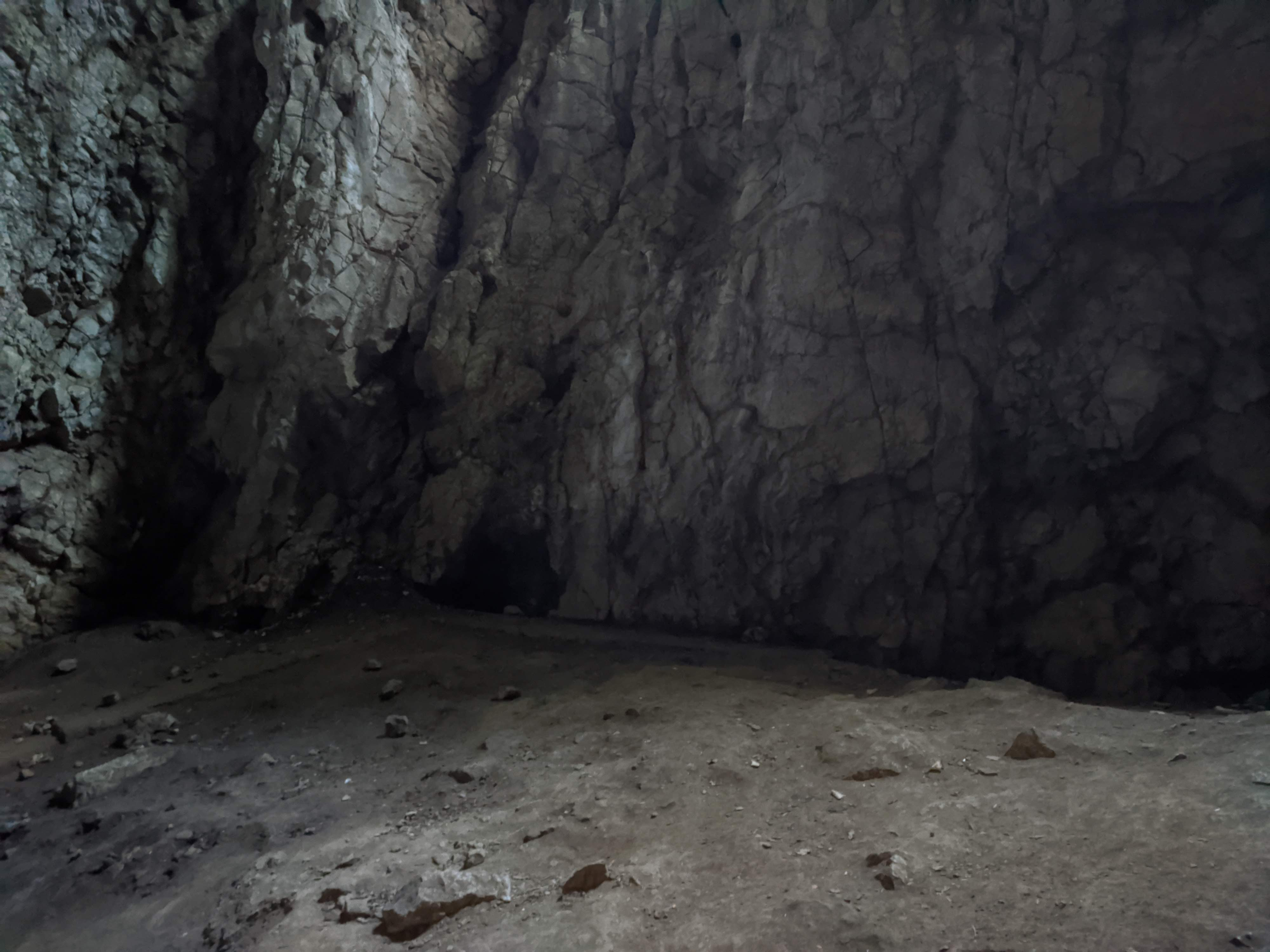

== See also ==
- List of longest Dinaric caves
