= Lazar's Canyon =

Coordinates: 44.018°N 21.923°E

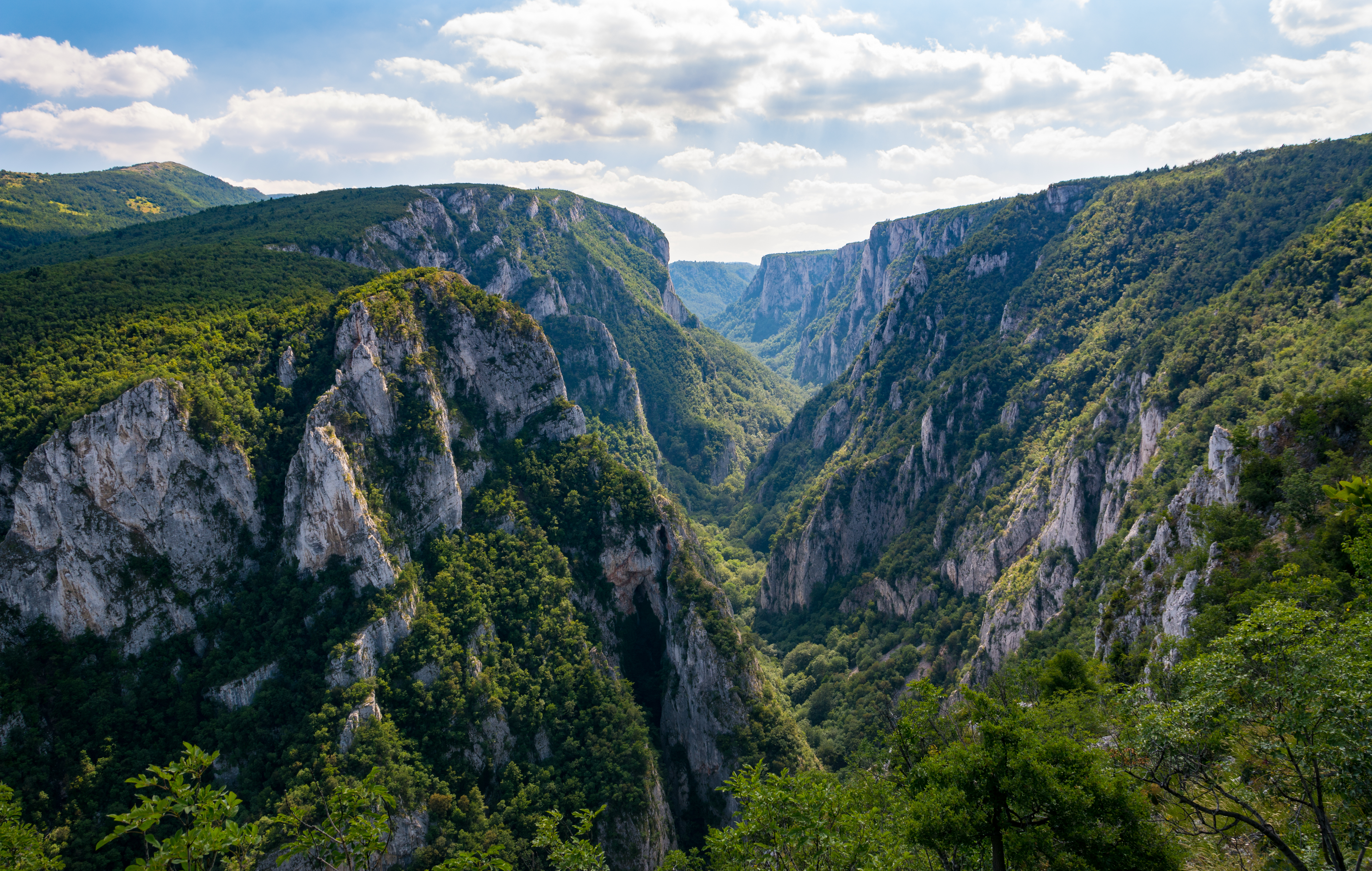
- Lazar's Canyon
- Interactive map of Lazar's Canyon
- Location: Serbia
- Nearest city: Bor

Lazar's Canyon or Lazar's Gorge (Serbian: Лазарев Кањон / Lazarev Kanjon) is located at about 10 kilometers from Bor. This is the deepest and longest canyon in eastern Serbia. Because of its steep rocky cliffs, the canyon has not yet been fully examined.

The canyon is famous for its numerous caves and pits. The best known are Lazareva Pećina (also known as Zlotska) and Vernikica and Dubašnička cave (also known as “Zlot caves”). Entire Lazar’s canyon is under state protection, and because of its unique beauty and rich flora and fauna, represents a challenge to all lovers of wilderness and unspoiled nature.

The canyon is quite inaccessible, and passing through it is a real adventure, at times quite challenging and arduous. In many places it is necessary to clamber over the rocks. Lazar’s Canyon, up to 9 km long and between 300 and 500 meters in height, is the longest canyon in eastern Serbia.

It is cut in the limestone massif of the South Kučaj mountain, and through it flows the river of the same name. On all sides there are sheltered rocky reefs: from the south and southeast rises Malinik (1087 m) from the North Strnjak (720 m) and Kornjet (696 m), and from the west Pogar (883 m) and Mikulja (1022 m). The cliffs of the canyon are vertical and straight, and the width at the narrowest part of the canyon is less than seven meters.

== History ==
Lazar's canyon, through which flows the river of the same name, was during the Turks, one of the most important refuge place of Homolje brigand. This canyon to outlaw meant salvation, because the Turks have never dared to follow them. Legend has it that after the battle of Marica in 1371, the cavalry of Lazar of Serbia came to this area, and stayed in the canyon for some time.

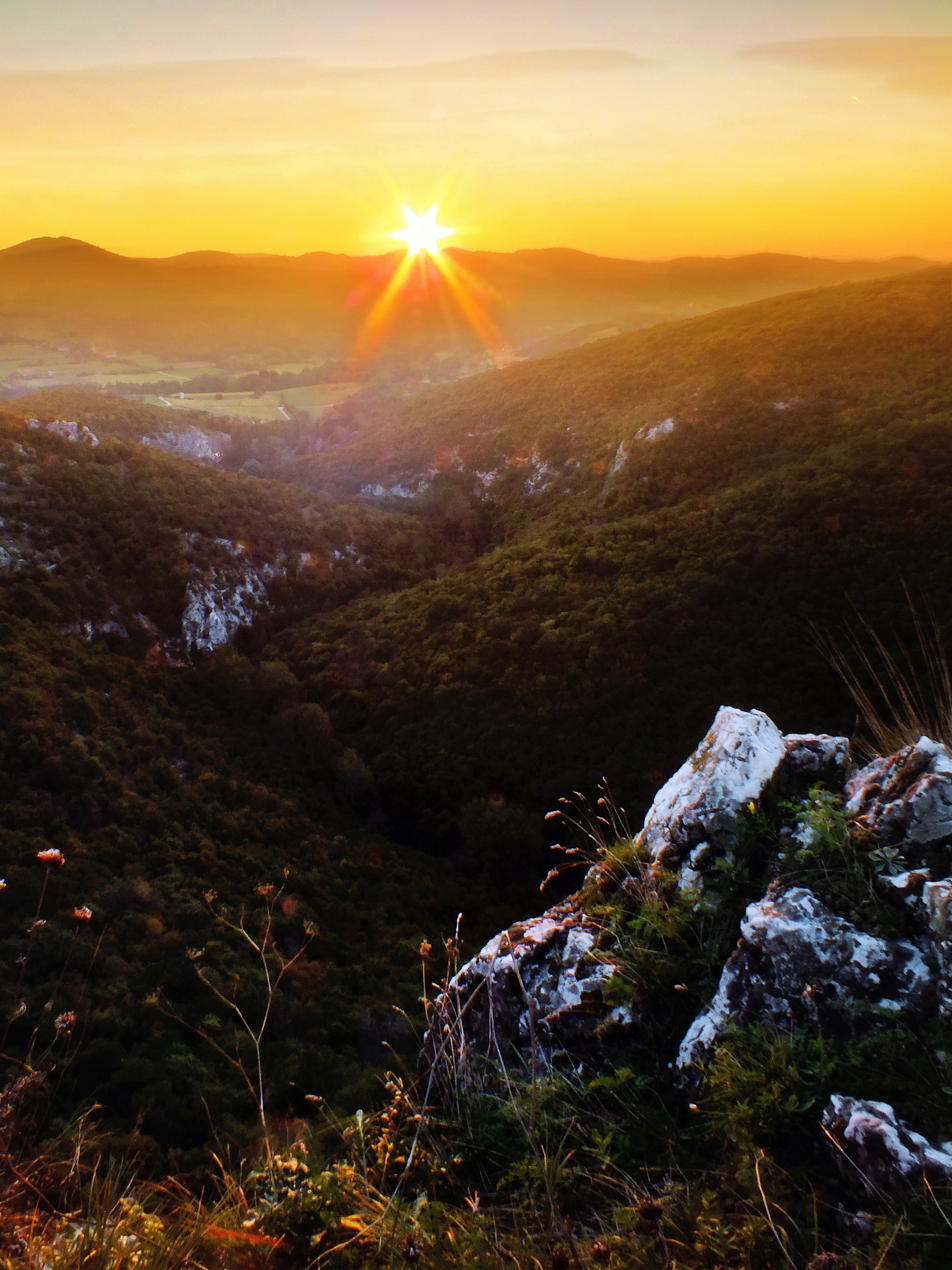
Sunrise in Lazarev Kanjon

== Location ==
The entrance to the Lazar’s canyon is in front of the Lazareva Pećina, which is a convenient place to raise the camp, since that is the only source of drinking water in the canyon. You can reach the spring if you go to a suspension bridge, then turn left and you pass an abandoned motel.

The canyon is quite inaccessible, in it there are walking tracks and the terrain is extremely difficult because of the large number of big rocks and fallen trees. For this reason it is necessary to have hiking shoes, and other mountaineering equipment.

The canyon is full with poisonous snakes (the most common is viper) so caution is therefore needed, since it takes about two hours to get to help. After 5–7 hours walk, Lazar’s Canyon branch. At this point there is a signpost on the left to Malinik, and on the right to the river Demizlok. Water from the river Demizlok is good to drink, at least judging by our experience.

About 1 hour walk after the abyss, after moving to the right side of the river you exit the canyon. Across the fields one reaches a road which leads back to the Zlot village.

After a 1-hour walk in the direction of Zlot, on the right side of the road there is a source of drinking water, which is not marked by any benchmark. The spring is located on a large meadow, downhill from the main road, in a small alcove. Beside the spring there are several houses in which farmers keep livestock in the summer. Along the way there are some fantastic vantage points overlooking the canyon. The time required to cross the canyon is 8-9h.

== Wildlife ==
Native to Lazarev Canyon are rare plants such as the Crimean pine and relict species of Taxus and Serbian ramonda, and animals like Chamois, Golden eagles, True owls, Peregrine falcons, endemic arthropods, and bats.

== Picture gallery ==
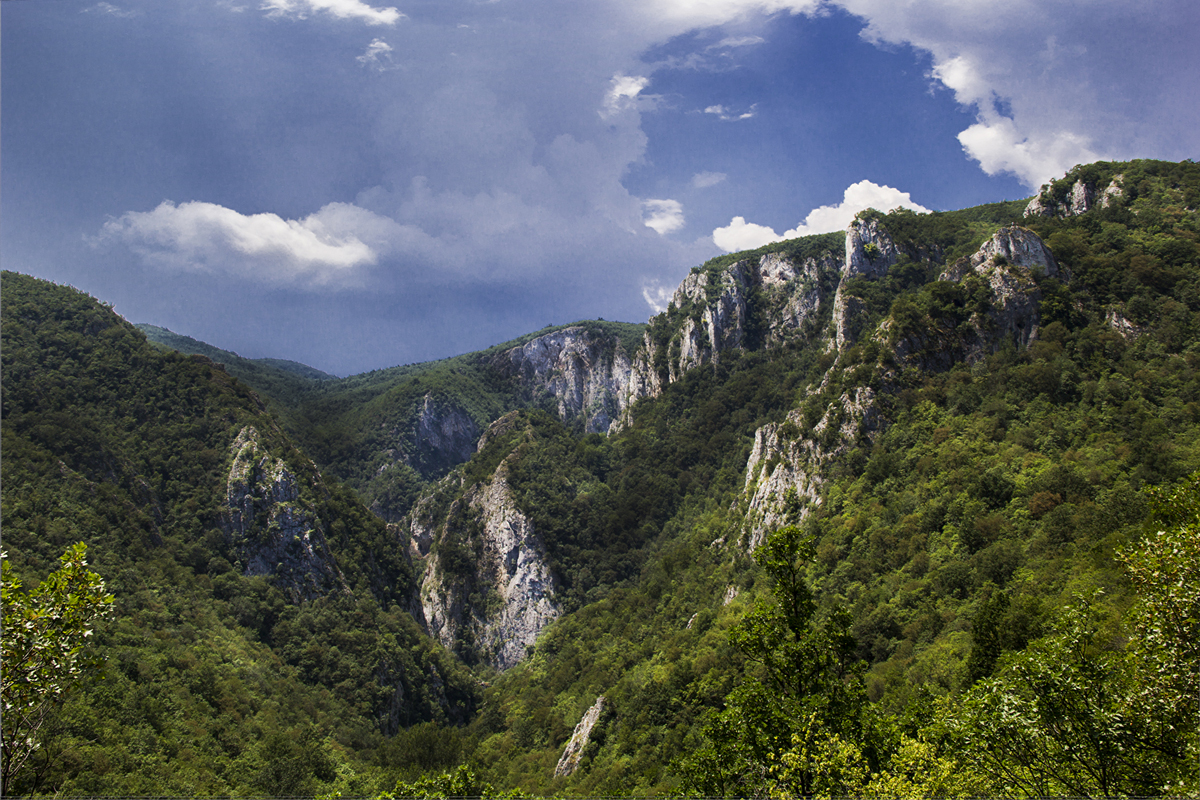
Lazar's Canyon

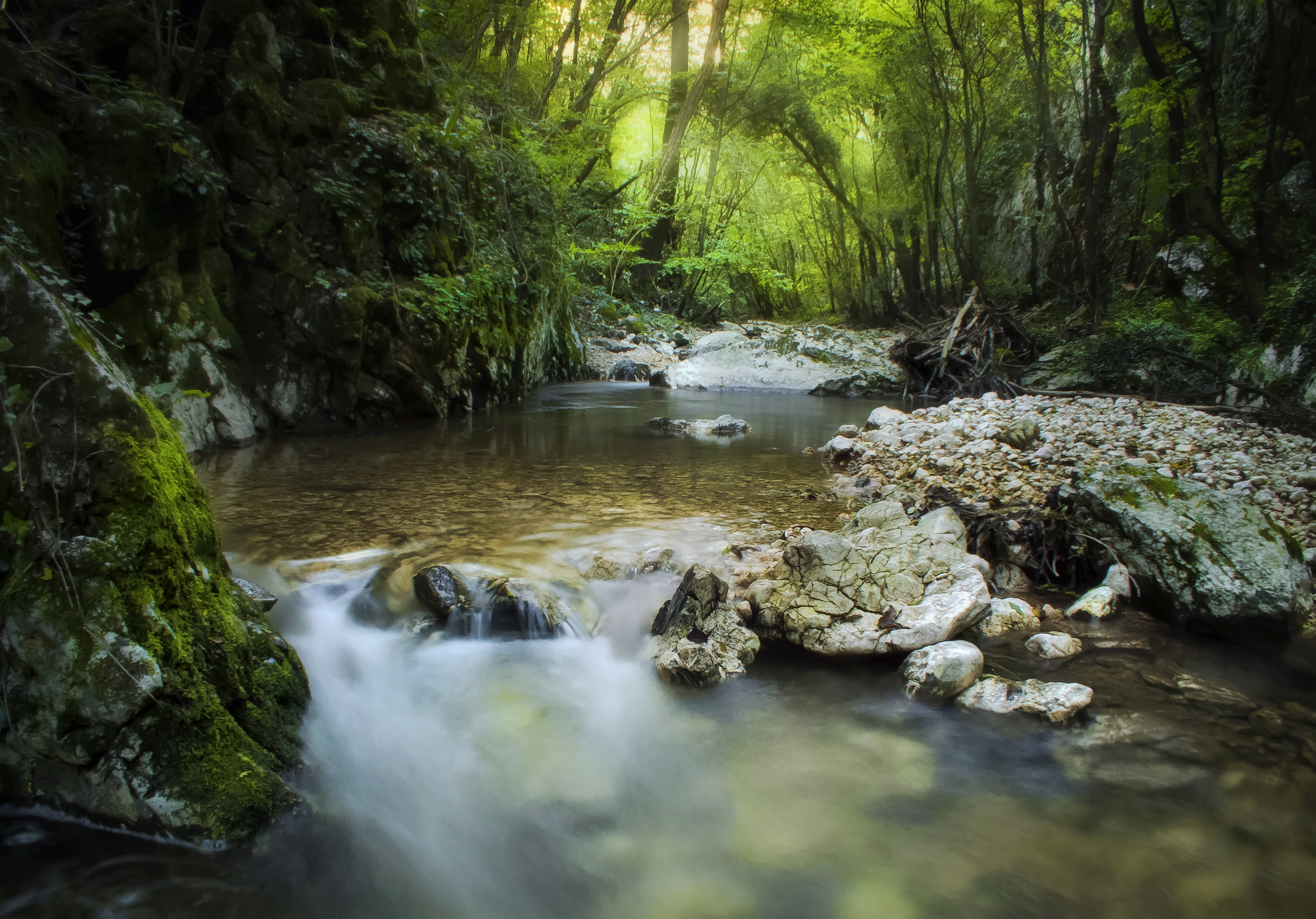
Lazar's Canyon River

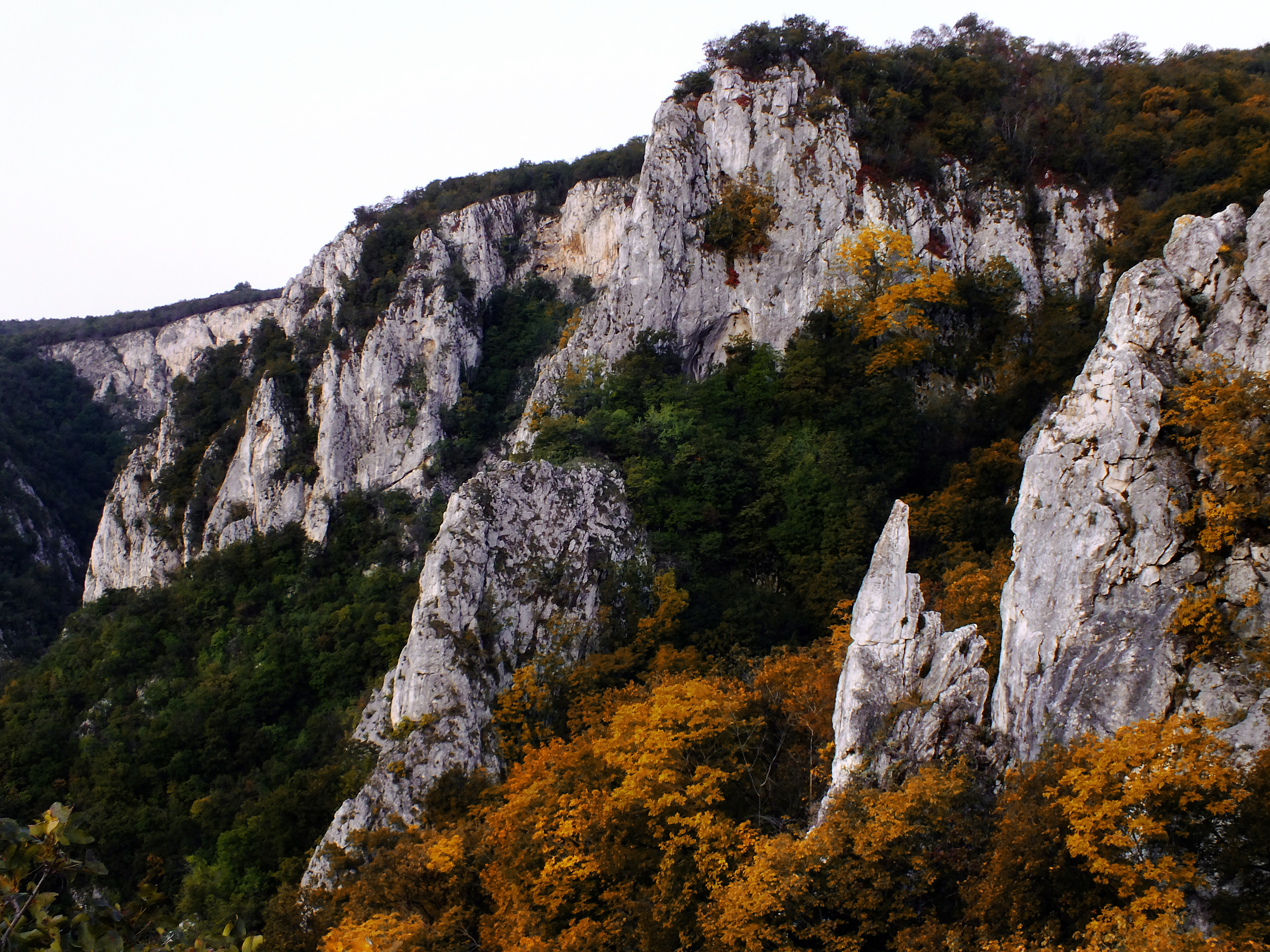
Lazar's Canyon

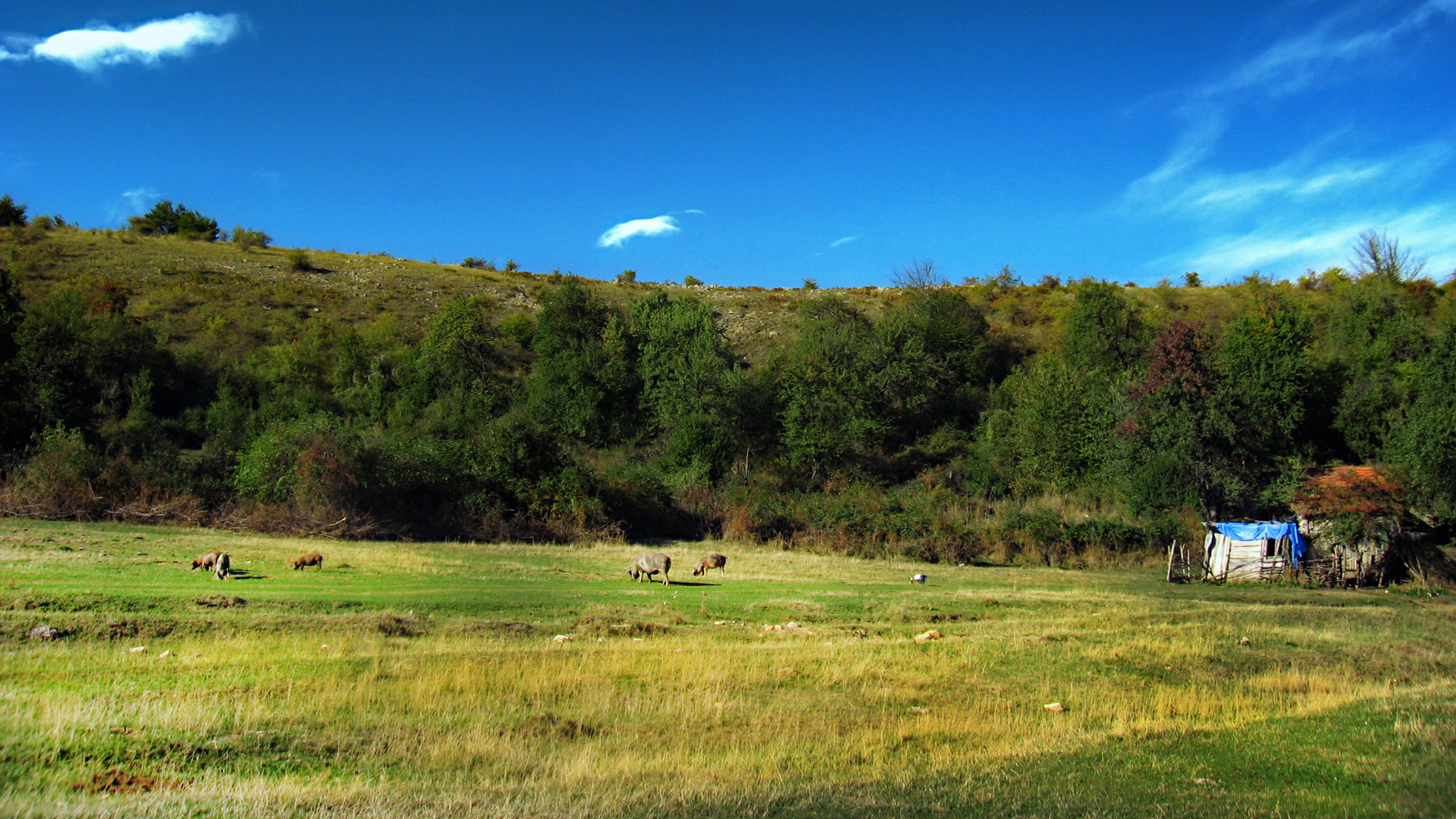
Lazar's Canyon entrance

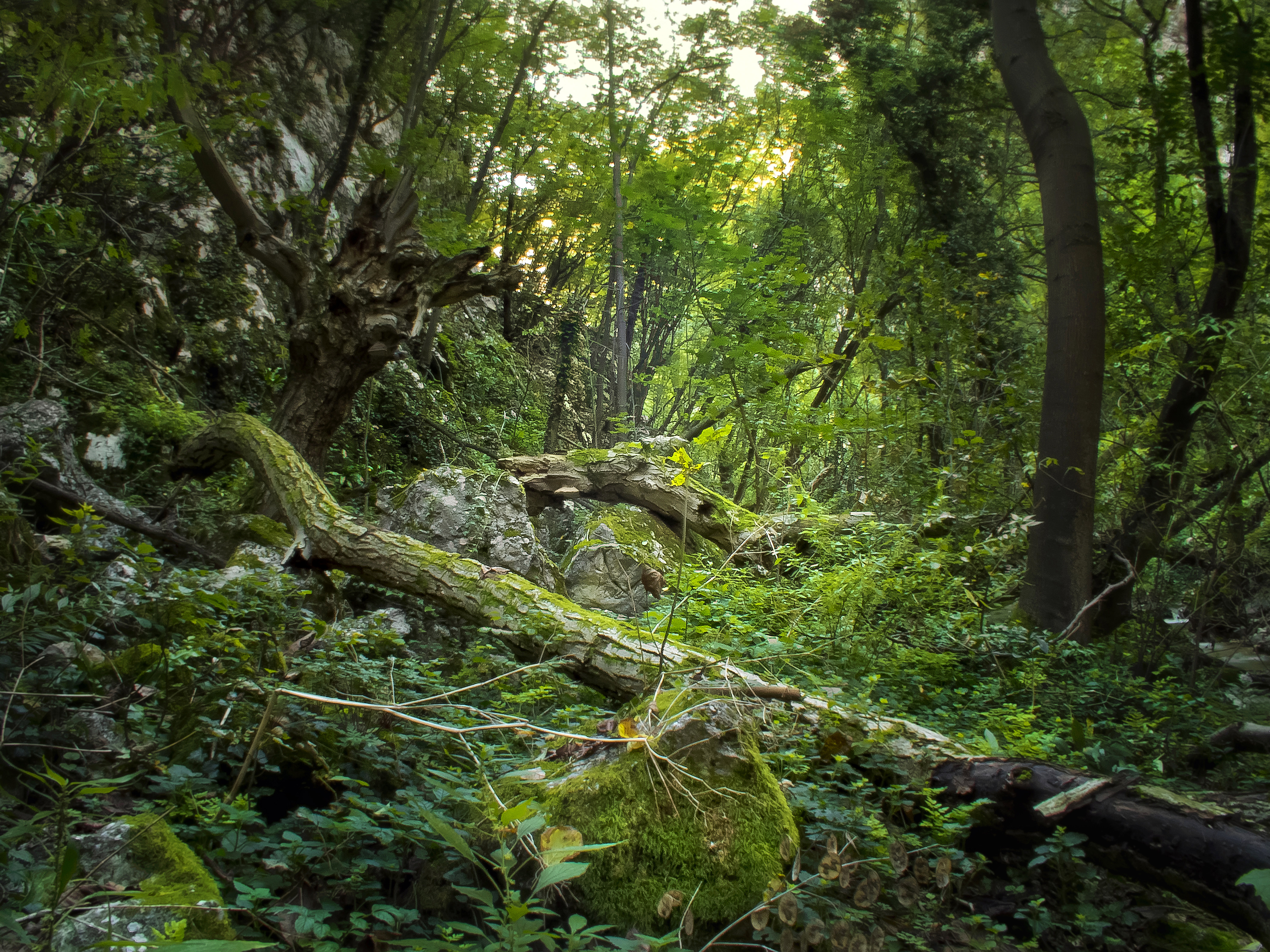
Forest in Lazar's Canyon

== See also ==
- Kučaj Mountains
- Lazareva Pećina
