= Crni Vrh (Bor) =

Mountain in Serbia

Crni vrh
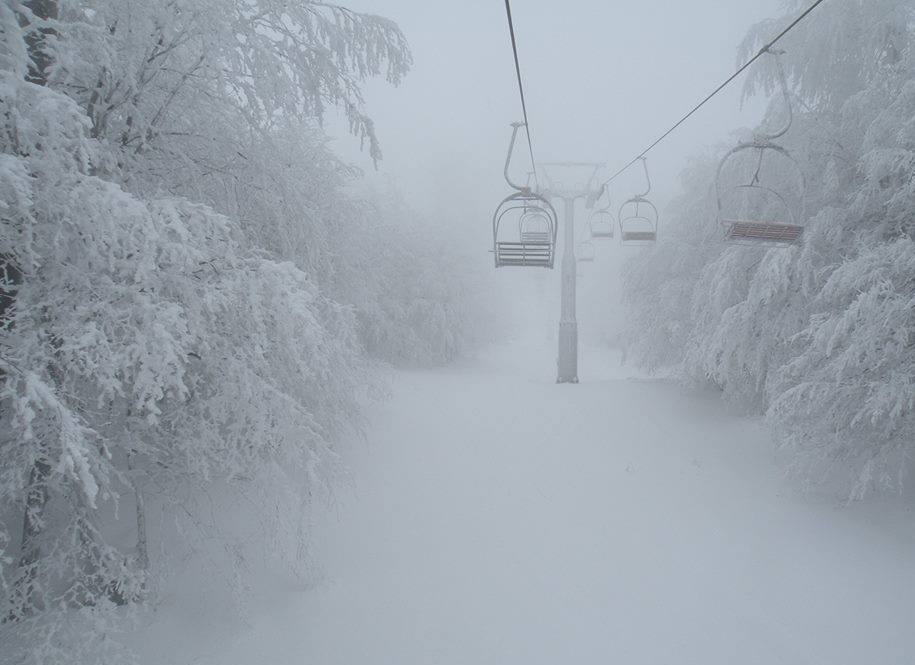

Highest point
- Elevation: 1,043 m (3,422 ft)
- Coordinates: 44°07′50″N 21°57′51″E

Geography
- Location within Serbia
- Location: Eastern Serbia
- Parent range: Carpathian Mountains

Crni vrh (Serbian Cyrillic: Црни врх, Romanian: Vârful Negru) is a mountain in eastern Serbia, to the west of the town of Bor . Its eponymous highest peak has an elevation of 1,043 m (3,422 ft) above sea level.

It is a minor winter resort, and has several ski tracks, with main ski track 1,100 m long and with height span of 260 m. A hotel complex was being built by a consortium of Serbian companies in the 1990s, however the work was halted during the NATO bombing. Currently, there is a mountaineering home near the track, with 30 beds.

== See also ==
- List of mountains in Serbia
