= Lazareva Pećina =

Coordinates: 44.0293°N 21.9627°E

Lazareva Pecina
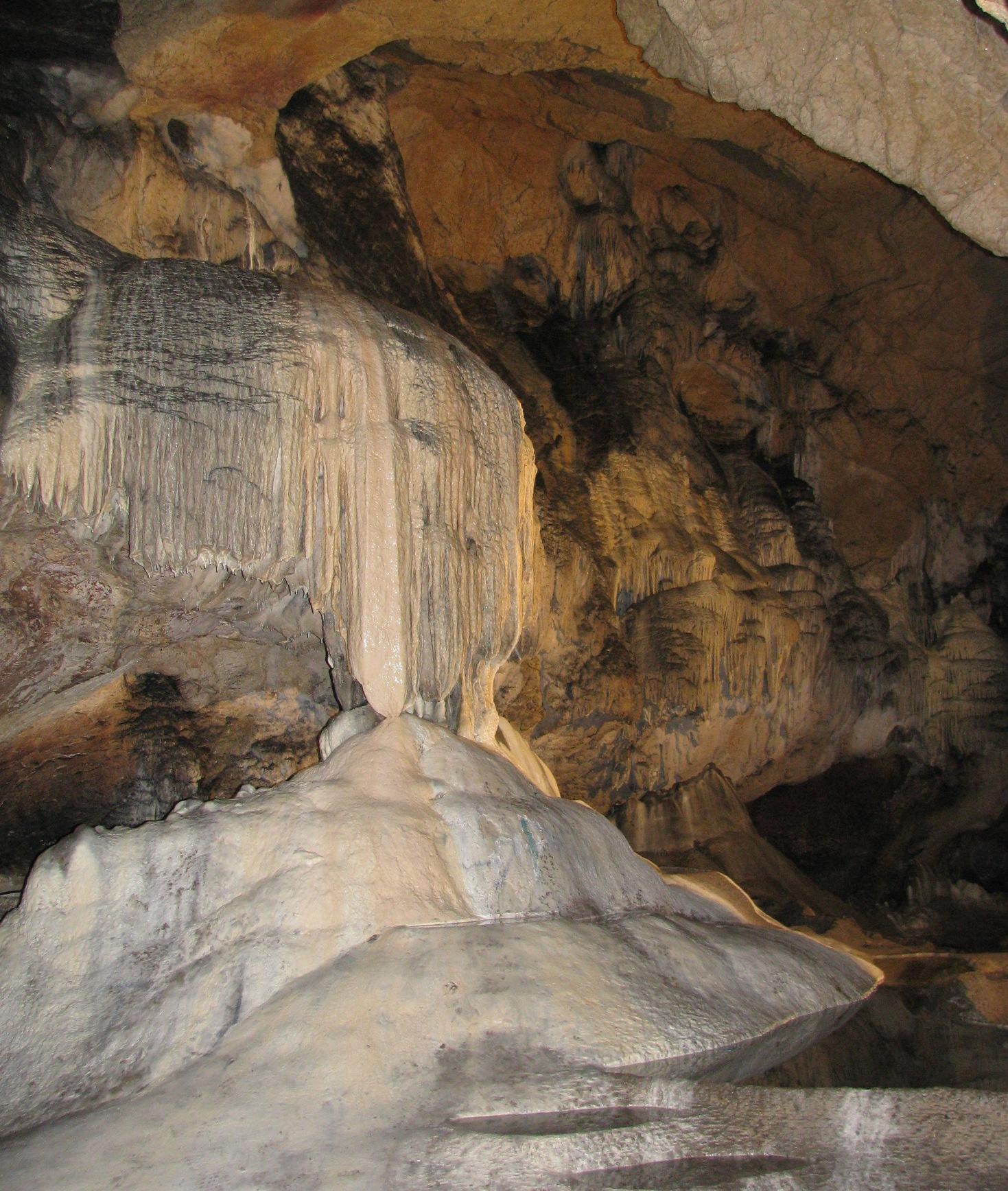
- Lazareva Pecina Cave
- Interactive map of Lazareva Pecina
- Location: Zlot, Bor municipality, Serbia

The Lazareva Pećina, which translates Lazar's Cave, is the longest explored cave in Serbia. Located in Bor municipality, near Zlot, the cave is also sometimes referred to as Zlotska Cave. According to 2012's Recent Landform Evolution: The Carpatho-Balkan-Dinaric Region, the cave is 9,407 metres (5.845 mi) long. The cave is situated near the entrance of the deep canyon carved into the mountains by the river Zlotska.

The cave exhibits a long history of mining, with evidence of copper metalworks in the cave dating back 5,000 years. The cave has been popular for tourism since at least the 19th century, when it was one of the three most popular caving destinations in Serbia along with Prekonoska and Petnicka. Some of the paths are luminated and tourist services offered for modern visitors. It has been protected since 1949.

== See also ==
- Lazar's Canyon
