= List of mines in Serbia =

The following list of mines in Serbia is subsidiary to the list of mines article and lists working, defunct and future mines in Serbia and is organised by the primary mineral output(s) and province. For a history of mining in the region now known as Serbia, see Vujic 2014.

For practical purposes stone, marble and other quarries may be included in this list. Operational mines are demarcated by bold typeface, future mines are demarcated in italics.

== Coal mines ==
- Kolubara coal basin
- Kostolac coal basin
- Resavica

== Cobalt mines ==
- Ruđinci mine
- Veluće mine

== Copper mines ==
- Bor mine
- Borska Reka mine
- Cerovo mine
- Dumitru Potok mine
- Kiseljak mine
- Majdanpek mine
- Mali Krivelj mine
- Veliki Krivelj mine

== Graphite mines ==
- Donja Ljubata mine

== Magnesium mines ==
- Bela Stena mine

== Molybdenum mines ==
- Mačkatica mine
- Surdulica mine

== Nickel mines ==
- Mokra Gora mine

== Unspecified ==
- Rudna Glava, former mine, now archaeological site
