= Bogovina =

Bogovina Боговина
- Town
- Location within Serbia
- Coordinates: 43°53′36″N 21°56′40″E
- Country: Serbia
- District: Zaječar District
- Municipality: Boljevac
- Mine opening: 1903

Area
  - Total: 77.26 km^{2} (29.83 sq mi)
- Elevation: 264 m (866 ft)

Population (2022)
  - Total: 908
  - Density: 11.8/km^{2} (30.4/sq mi)
- Time zone: UTC+1 (CET)
  - Summer (DST): UTC+2 (CEST)
- Postal code: 19372
- Area code: 030
- Vehicle registration: ZA

Bogovina (Serbian Cyrillic: Боговина) is a mining town located the municipality of Boljevac, eastern Serbia. As of 2022 census, it has a population of 908 inhabitants.

== Mine ==
Bogovina mine
- Location within Serbia
- Location: Serbia
- Products: Lignite (brown coal)
- Opened: 1903; 123 years ago
- Website: jppeu.rs/rmu-bogovina

Bogovina grew around the underground brown coal mine opened in 1903. It reached its pinnacle in the mid-20th century, with the high demand for coal during the industrial growth of the country. With the reduction in coal production, the town has been experiencing gradual depopulation. As of 2016, the Bogovina Coal Mine still employed 320 workers, but its destiny was uncertain due to the scheduled cessation of state subventions and likely closure of the mining complex within the PEU Resavica.

== Notable people ==
- Ljubiša Avramelović "Brka", boxer, five times Serbian champion, two times Yugoslavian champion
- Žika Nikolić, singer

== See also ==
- List of mines in Serbia
