= Bor mine =

Mine in Serbia

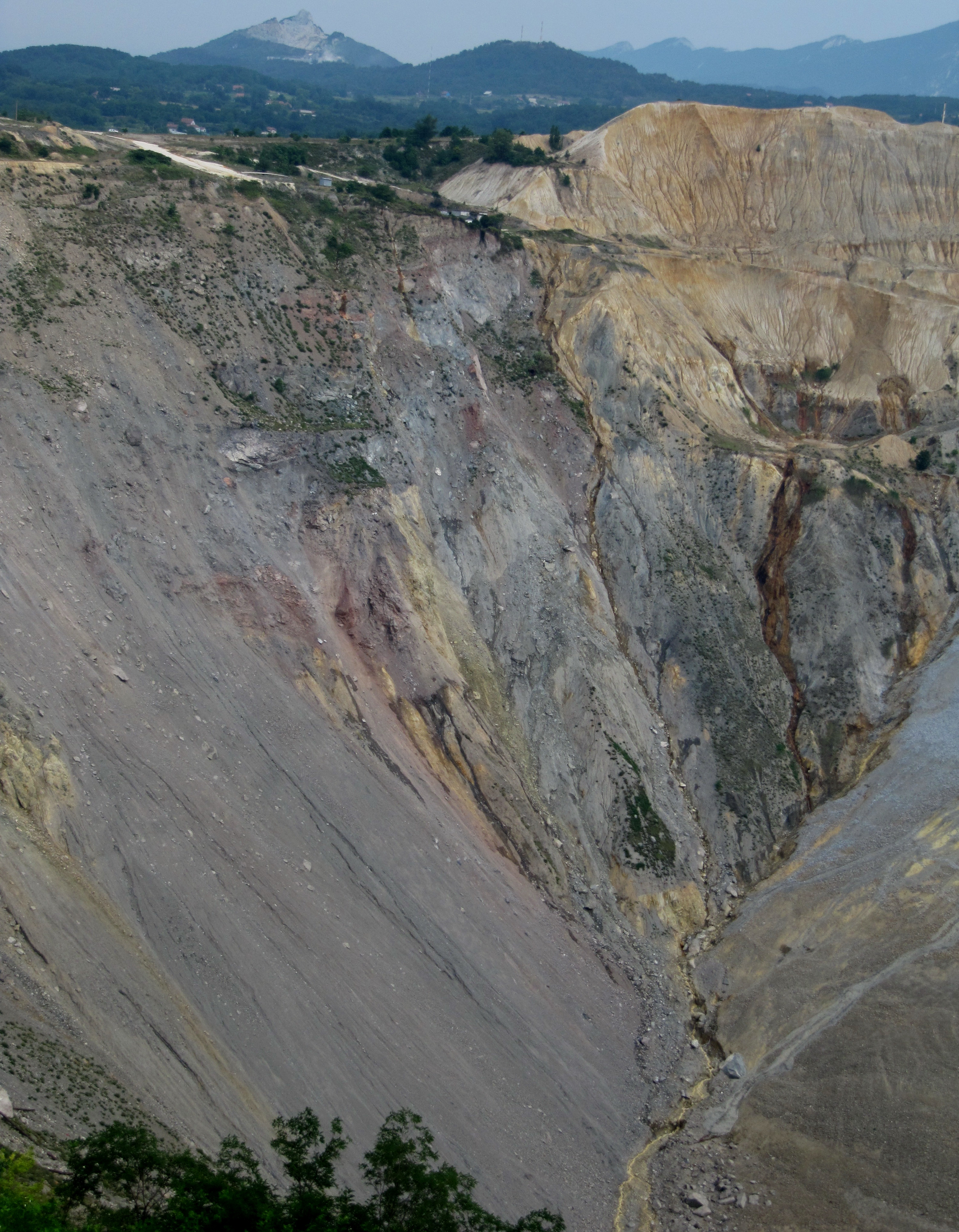
- Old Bor mine pit, August 2014

- Location within Serbia
- Location: Bor, Serbia; 44°04′35″N 22°06′37″E
- Products: Copper, Gold, Silver
- Company: Serbia Zijin Bor Copper

The Bor mine is a large copper mine located near the city of Bor, east Serbia. It is operated by the Chinese-owned Serbia Zijin Bor Copper.

It is one of the largest copper reserves in Serbia and in the world, having estimated reserves of 200 million tonnes of ore grading 1.5% copper. The area had been mined for gold as far back as at least the ancient Romans, but copper ore was only discovered, accidentally, in 1902.

Local legend holds that a young local man, Paun Meždinović, was the discover of the first lump of copper ore, but it was industrialist Đorđe Vajfert who made the first formal exploitations - forming La Compagnie française des mines de Bor, Concession St. George with French financing, in1903. As early as 1904, the mine employed around 80 miners and, during that year, 5,500 tons of copper ore were excavated, resulting in 774 tons of pure copper. In the first five years, the French company capital was increased from the initial 5.5 to 7 million French francs in gold.

Copper was transferred to the nearest train station in Vražogrnci by ox-carts until 1911, when they were replaced by the new Bor-Metovnica railway. The expansion of the facilities, particularly the smelter and the froth flotation tanks, brought about environmental pollution from the sulfuric acid fumes. This had an indirect influence on the increase in the price of food products in the area, as well as protests from the local population involved in agriculture.

Following periods of economic lull and boom, the Bor Mines and Smelters public company was founded by Yugoslav government decree by 1945. Digging was undertaken manually due to lack of modernisation funds, but with reports of "up to 160%" improvements over pre-war output due to "great working-class enthusiasm" and "voluntary extra hours". Largely due to the growth of the mine's workforce and associated industry, the town of Bor was given city status in 1947. The Bor Mining and Smelting Combine was formed in 1961 and women were first employed in the organisation at that time.
