= Aleksinački Rudnik =

Aleksinački Rudnik Алексиначки Рудник
- Settlement
- Location within Serbia
- Coordinates: 43°33′29″N 21°41′29″E
- Country: Serbia
- District: Nišava District
- Municipality: Aleksinac

Area
  - Total: 0.84 km^{2} (0.32 sq mi)
- Elevation: 197 m (646 ft)

Population (2011)
  - Total: 1,293
  - Density: 1,500/km^{2} (4,000/sq mi)
- Time zone: UTC+1 (CET)
  - Summer (DST): UTC+2 (CEST)
- Postal code: 18,226
- Vehicle registration: AL

Aleksinački Rudnik (Serbian Cyrillic: Алексиначки Рудник, meaning "Mine of Aleksinac") is a mining settlement located near the town of Aleksinac, Serbia. The population of the town is 1,293 people as of 2011.

== Demographics ==
As of the 2002 census, there were 1,147 adult residents and the average age is 37.5 years (36.1 for men and 39.0 for women). The settlement has 574 households, and the average number of members per household is 2.56.

== Mine ==
Aleksinac mine
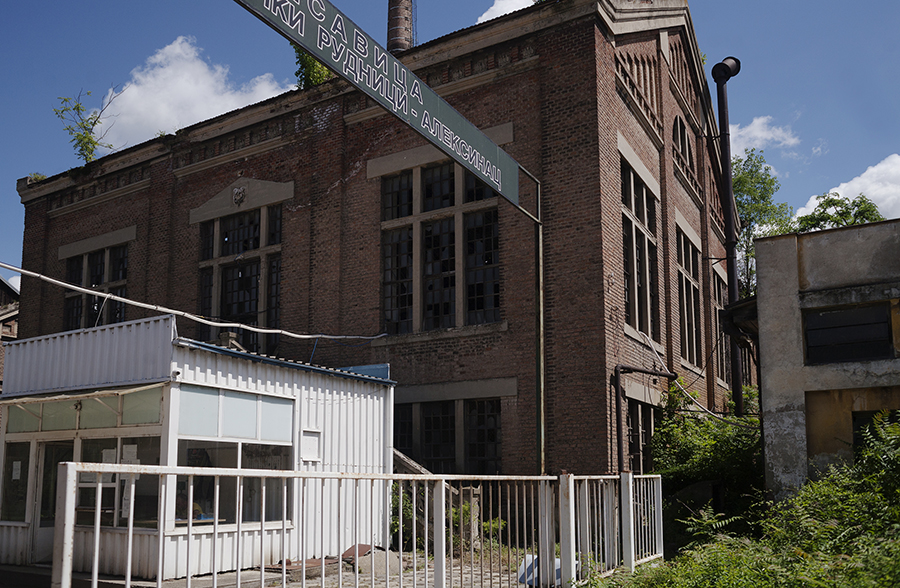
- View on the main mine building

- Location within Serbia
- Opened: 1883; 143 years ago
- Active: 1883–1990
- Closed: 1990
- Company: PEU Resavica
- Website: jppeu.rs/rgp-aleksinac

The mining in the Aleksinac area started in 1883, when Đorđe Dimitrijević, a local doctor, and Johan Apel, owner of the Aleksinac Brewery, received a permit for coal mining on the area of 950 hectares. First tonnes of coal were used as fuel for the Brewery, which was, however, moved to Niš in 1884. Still, the mine further expanded and in 1902, it was sold to a Belgian company, which expanded the production to 40–60,000 tonnes annually. In the World War I, Austrian and German occupying forces took over the production and nearly destroyed the mine during the retreat in 1918.

In the interwar period, the mine recovered and still expanded; in 1922 it had 1,013 employees. The first major accident struck in 1924, when 10 miners died. During that period, it was considered the most profitable coal mine in Serbia. During the World War II, it was run by the German occupying forces, and after their defeat the mine was nationalized in 1946. The highest coal production was achieved in 1963, when 444,007 tonnes of coal were produced out of six shafts.

During this time, the mining settlement (town) hosted a range of facilities for the employees: mining and industrial school, school of administration, free tramway line to Aleksinac, a hotel, sporting grounds, library, ambulance. The age of cheap oil meant a reduction of coal production, which was still maintained at a formidable level of 251,433 tonnes in 1981. The "Morava" shaft with the depth of 750 m below the surface was the deepest one in entire Yugoslavia.

On 18 November 1989, the worst tragedy in the history of Serbian mining struck the mine. An underground fire caused by negligence at the depth of 700 m killed the entire shift of 90 miners, who suffocated from the smoke and carbon monoxide. The entire mine was closed in 1990. The disaster left the permanent consequences for the population, who lost the husbands and fathers, and a source of income. The missing jobs have been partly compensated by formation of a mining engineering company RGP Aleksinac (operated by the PEU Resavica mining company), which performs mining jobs on other mining sites in the region.

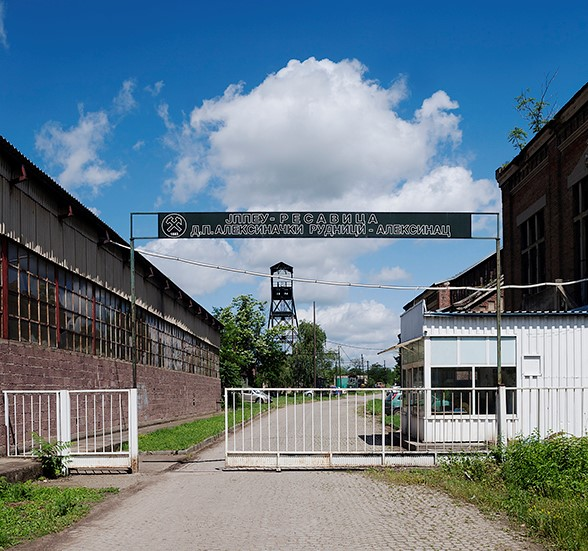
Entrance to the mine, March 2019

== See also ==
- List of mines in Serbia
- List of populated places in Serbia
