= Xanadu Mines =

Australian-based copper and gold exploration company operating in Mongolia

Xanadu Mines Ltd is an Australian exploration company, formerly listed on the Australian Securities Exchange (ASX: XAM) and the Toronto Stock Exchange (TSX: XAM), primarily focused on copper and gold projects in Mongolia. The company is headquartered in Sydney, Australia, and maintains a significant presence in Mongolia, where it explores and develops large-scale mineral deposits. Xanadu was considered one of the more advanced ASX-listed copper-gold explorers operating in Central Asia. In 2025 it was acquired by Bastion Mining, being removed from the ASX on the 6th August 2025.

== History ==
Xanadu Mines was founded in the early 2000s and initially pursued coal and gold exploration in Mongolia. It shifted focus to large-scale copper-gold exploration in the mid-2010s, culminating in the acquisition and development of its flagship project, Kharmagtai.

== Projects ==
=== Kharmagtai Copper-Gold Project ===
Xanadu's flagship asset is the Kharmagtai Copper-Gold Project, located in the South Gobi region of Mongolia, approximately 420 km southeast of Ulaanbaatar. The project is situated within the South Gobi porphyry copper province, which also hosts major deposits such as Oyu Tolgoi and Tsagaan Suvarga.

In April 2022, Xanadu entered into a strategic partnership with China's Zijin Mining Group. Under the terms of a three-phase agreement, Zijin acquired a 45.7% interest in the Kharmagtai project and became Xanadu's largest shareholder. The companies established a 50:50 joint venture, Khuiten Metals, which holds a 76.5% effective interest in Kharmagtai.

A Pre-Feasibility Study (PFS) for Kharmagtai was completed in late 2024. The study outlined a 29-year mine life with projected average annual production of 60,000 to 80,000 tonnes of copper and 165,000 to 170,000 ounces of gold.

The Kharmagtai project is regarded as a significant emerging source of copper and gold critical to the energy transition. Analysts have highlighted its proximity to infrastructure and favourable geology as key advantages over regional peers.

=== Other projects ===
- Red Mountain Copper-Gold Project: Located within the Middle Paleozoic South Gobi Porphyry belt, Red Mountain is an early-stage exploration project targeting porphyry-style mineralization.
- Sant Tolgoi Copper-Nickel Project: Located in Zavkhan Province, Western Mongolia, Xanadu holds the right to earn up to 80% of the Sant Tolgoi project, targeting magmatic nickel-copper sulphide mineralization.

== Corporate affairs ==
Xanadu Mines is led by an Australian-based management team with substantial experience in Mongolian resource development. As of 2025, the company’s CEO is Dr. Andrew Stewart, a geologist with more than 20 years’ industry experience.

The company maintains compliance with both Australian and Canadian corporate governance standards, reflecting its dual listing on the ASX and TSX.

== Recognition and coverage ==
Xanadu Mines' activities have attracted significant attention in the Australian financial and mining media:

- The Australian Financial Review described Xanadu as a key junior player in the Mongolian copper sector.
- MiningNews.net reported independently on the company’s pre-feasibility outcomes and joint venture structure.
- The West Australian highlighted the company's role in supplying critical minerals needed for the global energy transition.
- Stockhead Australia identified Xanadu as a notable copper exploration stock among ASX small caps.
- Mining Journal profiled Xanadu's corporate transition from explorer to prospective producer.

Additionally, the company's market movements have been periodically covered by The Sydney Morning Herald and The Australian, particularly following its major partnership announcements.
