= PEU Resavica =

Underground coal mining company in Serbia

Coordinates: 44°02′27″N 21°34′48″E

- Native name: ПЕУ Ресавица
- Founded: 15 May 2003; 23 years ago (Current form); 1992; 34 years ago (Founded)
- Headquarters: Resavica, Despotovac, Serbia
- Area served: Serbia
- Key people: Saša Spasić (Director)
- Products: Coal, lignite
- Production output: 353,935 tonnes of coal (2023)
- Revenue: ▲€88.91 million (2025)
- Net income: ▼ (€10.78 million) (2025)
- Total assets: ▼€68.24 million (2025)
- Total equity: ▲ (€133.25 million) (2025)
- Owner: Government of Serbia (66.14%); PIO Fund of Serbia (32.86%)
- Number of employees: 3,617 (2025)
- Subsidiaries: Đula d.o.o. Resavica; Rembas Trans d.o.o. Resavica
- Website: jppeu.rs
- Footnotes; Business ID: 17507699

PEU Resavica (Serbian Cyrillic: ПЕУ Ресавица) is a Serbian state-owned underground coal mining company headquartered in Resavica, the municipality of Despotovac, Serbia. As of 2025, it has a total of 3,617 employees.

== Name ==
The full legal name of the company is Public Enterprise for underground coal exploitation Resavica (Serbian Cyrillic: Јавно Предузеће за подземну експлоатацију угља Ресавица).

== History ==
In 1992, the company was founded as part of Elektroprivreda Srbije (EPS) system, and works in the current form (separate from Elektroprivreda Srbije) since 15 May 2003.

As of 2021, PEU Resavica reportedly gets around 40 million in subsidies from the Government of Serbia annually. The coal mined at mines of PEU Resavica is sold primarily to Elektroprivreda Srbije for electricity generation, but also to the industry, heating plants, schools and individual households for heating. Around 50% of all coal produced at mines of PEU Resavica is used for the electricity generation at TPP Morava.

A 2025 report described working conditions in mines operated by the PEU Resavica as poor and highlighted outdated facilities and low wages.

== Mines ==
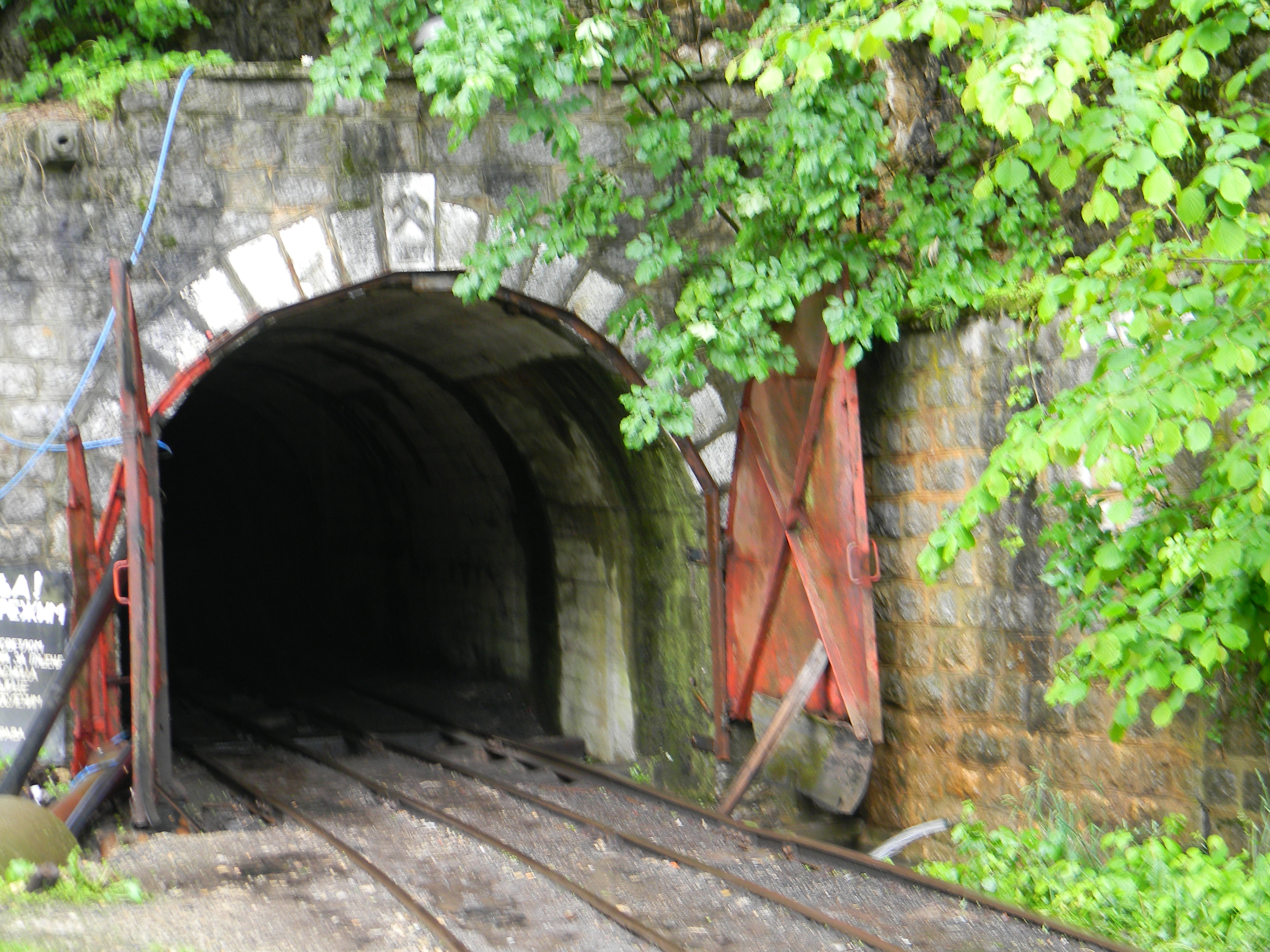
Entrance to the Rembas mine near Stenjevac, Despotovac

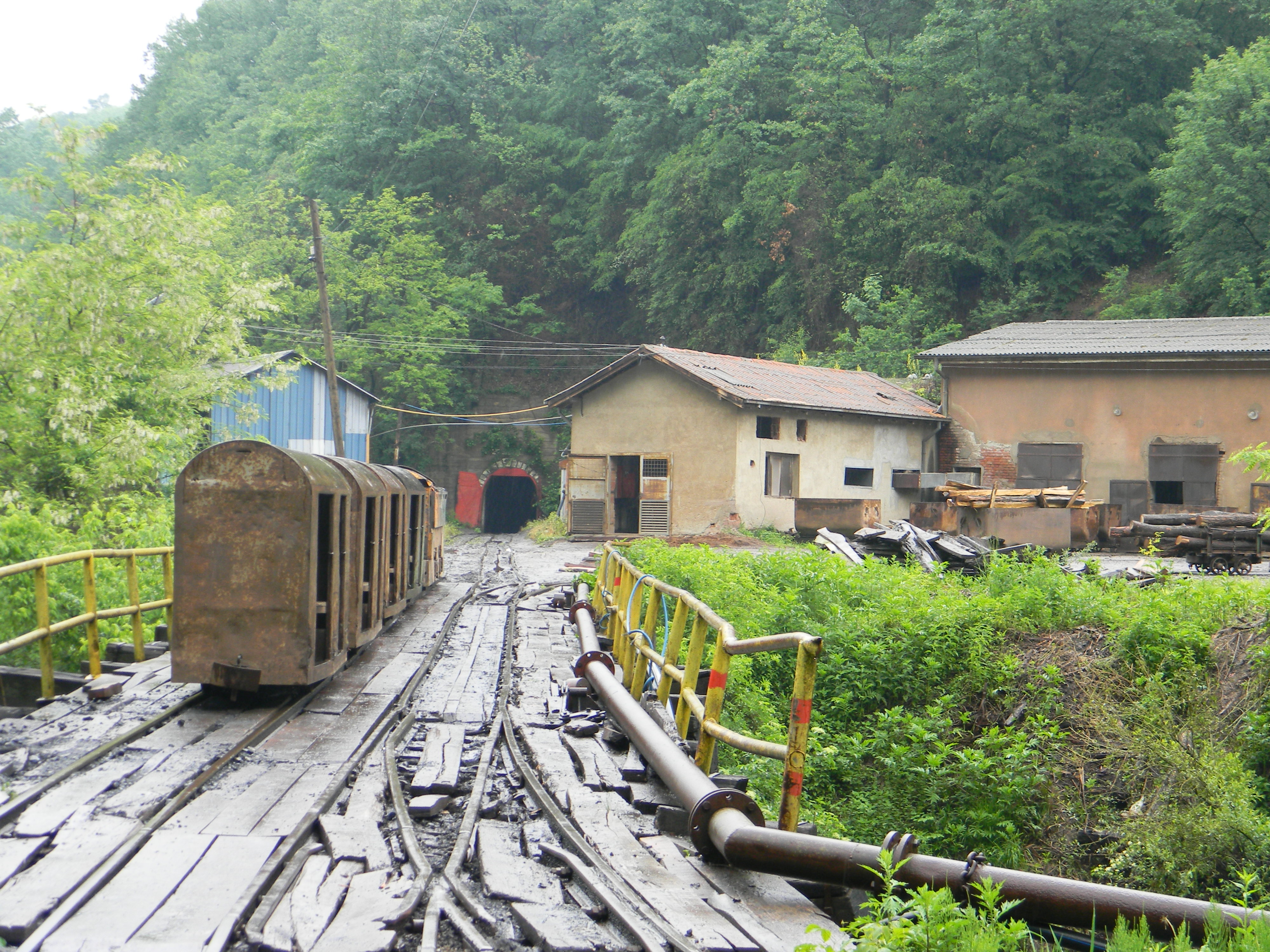
View on Rembas mine wagon near Stenjevac, Despotovac

The company operates the following mines:

- Vrška Čuka mine (anthracite)
- Ibarski rudnici mine (coal)
- Rembas mine (lignite) (includes mine production pits in Jelovac, Ravna Reka, Senjski Rudnik, and Strmosten)
- Bogovina mine (lignite)
- Soko mine (coal)
- Jasenovac mine (coal)
- Štavalj mine (coal)
- Lubnica mine (coal)
- Aleksinac mine (lignite, oil shale; closed)

== See also ==
- List of mines in Serbia
