= Ruđinci mine =

Cobalt mine in Ruđinci, Raška, Serbia

- Location: Ruđinci, Raška District, Serbia
- Products: Cobalt

The Ruđinci mine is one of the largest cobalt mines in Serbia. The mine is located in Ruđinci in Raška District. The mine has reserves amounting to 14 million tonnes of ore graded 0.05% cobalt.
