= Grljan =

- Town
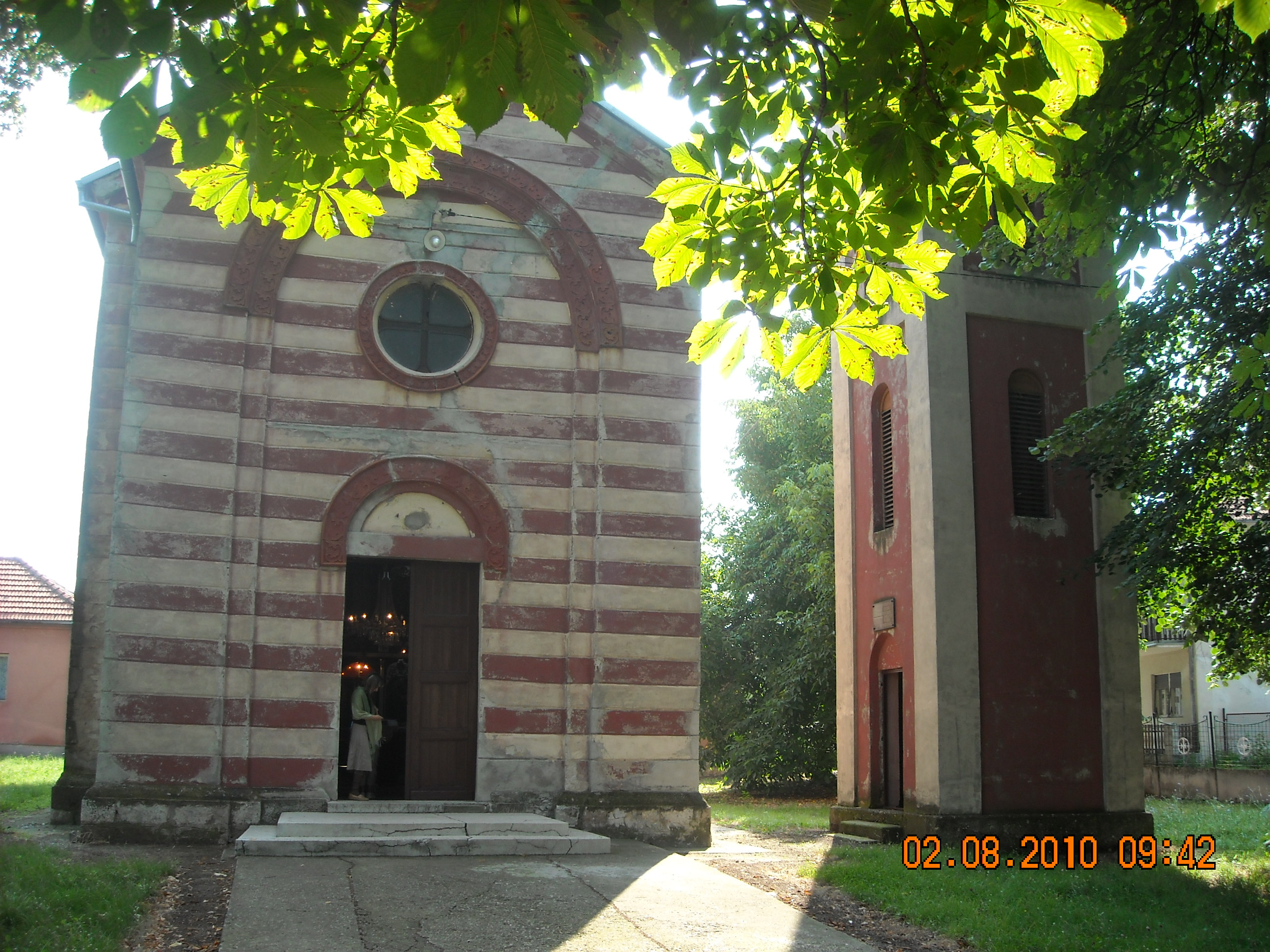

- Location within Serbia
- Coordinates: 43°51′N 22°17′E
- Country: Serbia
- District: Zaječar District
- city: Zaječar

Population (2002)
  - Total: 2,839
- Time zone: UTC+1 (CET)
  - Summer (DST): UTC+2 (CEST)

Grljan is a suburb of the city of Zaječar, Serbia, near the Bulgarian border. According to the 2002 census, the town had a population of 2,839. The village is situated in the Crna Reka region.

== History ==
Grljan is mentioned for the first time in the Ottoman defter dating to 1530, as part of the Crna Reka nahiya.

In 1784, Austrian spy Franz Pokorny in his report mention this village as a Christian settlement with 120 homes and Turkish roadhouse with capacity for 40 horses.

The village was a site of operations in the First Serbian Uprising (1804–13). The Crna Reka nahija was organized into Revolutionary Serbia, with a seat at Zaječar and the establishment of a magistrate (court). Eight trenches were built in the Crna Reka nahiya, one which was at Grljan. Serbian buljubaša Vilip Zagorski from Grljan fought under vojvoda Krsta of Svrljig.

The town's elementary school was founded in 1842, which makes it one of the oldest schools in district. In the Serbian-Ottoman War (1876-78), Grljan was buried to the ground. Its church was built in 1899. The great influence for economic development of this local community had mines near Vrška Čuka. In beginning of 20th century Grljan had a briquette factory. After the World War Two, Grljan was headquarter of companies TIMBAS (Timok coal mines) and Investgradnja. Since that period in the village, there is now only a small industrial zone. From 1978. there has been a unique festival of authentic music of Serbia, which gather the best artists on traditional wind instruments.

== Vrška Čuka Mine ==
Vrška Čuka Mine
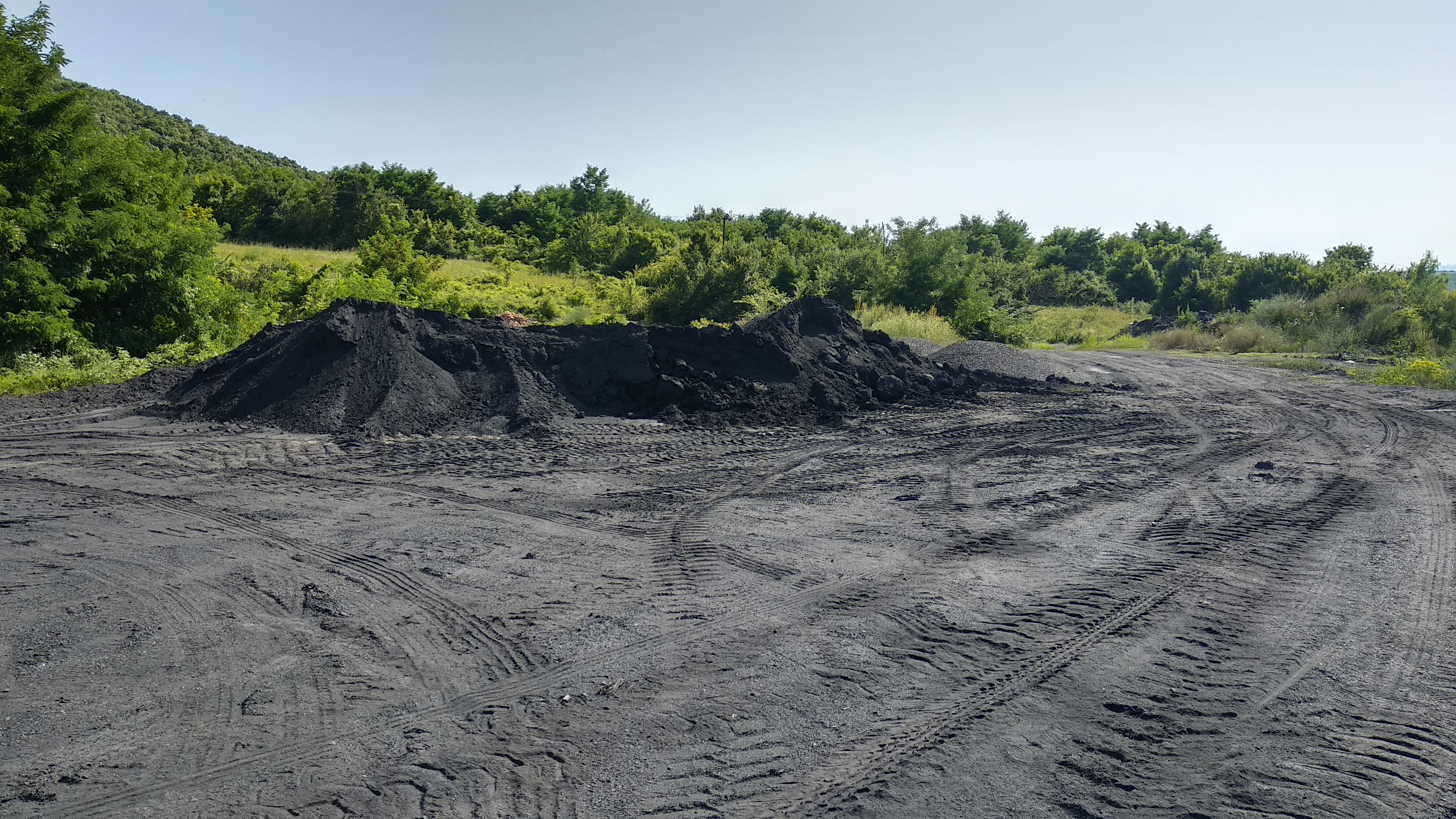
- Anthracite dug up from the mine, May 2020

- Location within Serbia
- Location: Avramica, Grljan, Zaječar
- Products: Anthracite
- Opened: 1884; 142 years ago
- Company: PEU Resavica
- Website: jppeu.rs/ra-vrska-cuka

On the territory of Grljan, near the Avramica hamlet, there is an active anthracite mine "Vrška Čuka", operated by the PEU Resavica mining company. It is one of the oldest mines in Serbia, dating back to 1884.

== Notable people ==
- Radul-Bey Gligorijević, landowner and founder of "Radul-begov Konak" in Zaječar.
- Todor Kostadinov (fl. 1806–), Serbian revolutionary

== Sources ==
- Jovanović, Dragoljub K. (1883). "Црна река". Glasnik Srpskog učenog društva. 54: 187–256.
- Nenadović, Konstantin N. (1884). Живот и дела великог Ђорђа Петровића Кара-Ђорђа. Vol. II (1 ed.). Vienna: У Штампарији Јована Н. Вернаја – via Google Books.
- Protić, Kosta (1893). "Ратни догађаји из првога српског устанка под Карађорђем Петровићем 1804—1813". Годишњица Николе Чупића. XIII. Državna štamparija.
