= Bela Stena mine =

Mine in Serbia

- Location: Bela Stena, Raška District, Serbia
- Products: Magnesite

The Bela Stena mine is one of the largest magnesite mines in Serbia. The mine is located in Bela Stena in Raška District. The mine has reserves amounting to 4 million tonnes of ore grading 44% magnesite and 1.5% silica thus resulting 1.76 million tonnes of magnesite and 60,000 tonnes of silica.
