= Lubnica, Zaječar =

- Village
- Location within Serbia
- Coordinates: 43°51′51″N 22°11′56″E
- Country: Serbia
- District: Zaječar District
- Municipality: Zaječar

Population (2002)
  - Total: 1,052
- Time zone: UTC+1 (CET)
  - Summer (DST): UTC+2 (CEST)

Lubnica, Zaječar is a village in the municipality of Zaječar, Serbia. According to the 2002 census, the village has a population of 1052 people.

== Mine ==
Lubnica mine
- Location within Serbia
- Products: Coal
- Opened: 1909; 117 years ago
- Company: PEU Resavica
- Website: jppeu.rs/rl-lubnica

On the territory of Lubnica, there is an active coal mine Lubnica, operated by the PEU Resavica.
