= Baljevac na Ibru =

Baljevac Баљевац
- Town
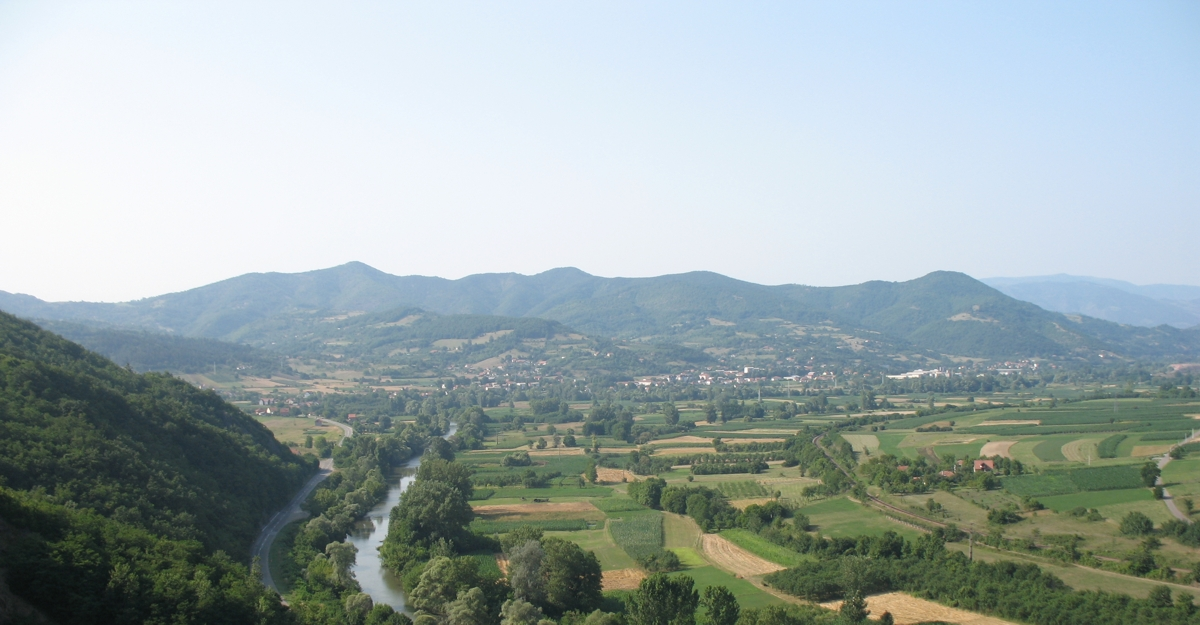
- A view on Baljevac

- Location within Serbia
- Coordinates: 43°23′33″N 20°38′11″E
- Country: Serbia
- District: Raška District
- Municipality: Raška

Area
  - Total: 13.25 km^{2} (5.12 sq mi)

Population (2011)
  - Total: 1,482
  - Density: 111.8/km^{2} (289.7/sq mi)
- Time zone: UTC+1 (CET)
  - Summer (DST): UTC+2 (CEST)
- Postal code: 36344
- Vehicle registration: RA

Baljevac (Serbian Cyrillic: Баљевац), also known as Baljevac na Ibru (Serbian Cyrillic: Баљевац на Ибру), is a town located in the municipality of Raška, southwestern Serbia. It is situated on the banks of the Ibar River. The population of the town is 1,482 people (2011 census).

== Ibarski rudnici Mine ==
Ibarski rudnici mine
- Location within Serbia
- Products: Coal
- Opened: 1924; 102 years ago
- Company: PEU Resavica
- Website: jppeu.rs/rku-ibarski-rudnici

On the territory of Baljevac na Ibru, there is an active coal mine "Ibarski rudnici", operated by the PEU Resavica mining company.
