= Čitluk (Sokobanja) =

Čitluk Читлук
- Village
- Location within Serbia
- Coordinates: 43°38′37″N 22°01′02″E
- Country: Serbia
- District: Zaječar District
- Municipality: Sokobanja

Population (2002)
  - Total: 806
- Time zone: UTC+1 (CET)
  - Summer (DST): UTC+2 (CEST)

Čitluk is a village in the municipality of Sokobanja, Serbia. According to the 2002 census, the village has a population of 806 people.

== Soko Mine ==
Soko mine
- Interactive map of Soko mine
- Products: Coal
- Opened: 1898; 128 years ago
- Company: PEU Resavica
- Website: jppeu.rs/rmu-soko

Near the settlement of Vrelo, within the village of Čitluk, there is an active coal mine Soko, operated by the PEU Resavica mining company.
