= Zijin Mining =

China-based multinational mining company

Zijin Mining Group Co., Limited
- Trade name: 紫金矿业
- Native name: 紫金矿业集团股份有限公司
- Romanized name: zǐjīn kuàngyè jítuán gǔfèn yǒuxiàn gōngsī
- Type: Public; partly state-owned
- Traded as: SSE: 601899; SEHK: 2899; CSI A50
- Industry: Mining
- Founded: 1986; 40 years ago as Shanghang Mineral Company
- Headquarters: Shanghang, Longyan, Fujian, People's Republic of China
- Area served: Worldwide
- Key people: Chairman: Mr. Chen Jinghe
- Products: Gold, Copper, Zinc
- Revenue: CN¥349,080,000,000 (FY 2025) ≈ US$49,200,000,000
- Net income: CN¥51,780,000,000 (FY 2025) ≈ US$7,290,000,000
- Number of employees: 65,000
- Website: www.zijinmining.com

Zijin Mining Group Co., Limited is a publicly-traded partly state-owned mining company headquartered in Longyan, Fujian, China. It is one of the largest producers of gold, copper, and zinc in the country, with operations across Asia, Africa, Europe, and the Americas.

== Corporate affairs ==
Zijin is listed on both the Shanghai Stock Exchange and the Hong Kong Stock Exchange. Its largest shareholder is the Shanghang Minxi Xinghang State-Owned Property Investment Company, which holds a 24% stake and is controlled by the government of Shanghang County, where the company is based.

== History ==
Zijin was founded in 1986 as the Shanghang Mineral Company and later restructured into its current corporate form. In 2006, Zijin produced 49.28 tonnes of gold, accounting for over 20% of China's total output. Production rose to 69 tonnes in 2010, but declined to about 37 tonnes by 2018. Zijin has expanded aggressively abroad through a number of acquisitions in the 2010s and 20s.

In 2025, Zijin subsidiaries were added to the U.S. forced labor entity list under the Uyghur Forced Labor Prevention Act, banning their goods from entering the American market.

== Domestic operations ==
Zijin Mining has significant operations in China, including some of the largest gold and copper mines in the country.

- Zijinshan Gold and Copper Mine (Fujian Province): The company's flagship domestic project, it includes both open-pit and underground mining operations and produces gold, copper, and silver. It was one of the first mines in China to use bioleaching technology for low-grade gold.
- Julong Copper Mine (Tibet Autonomous Region): One of the largest porphyry copper mines in China, this high-altitude operation has become a major contributor to China's domestic copper output since Zijin assumed control in 2020.
- Duobaoshan Copper Mine (Heilongjiang Province): A key copper operation in Northeast China, acquired and modernized by Zijin, with both mining and smelting facilities.
- Shanghang Mine (Fujian Province): The original base of Zijin's operations, producing gold and serving as a major processing hub for surrounding deposits.

== International operations ==
Zijin operates a global portfolio of mining and exploration assets, including wholly owned subsidiaries, majority-owned companies, and strategic equity investments. The company's primary focus is on gold and copper, with growing interests in lithium, zinc, and other critical minerals.

=== Major projects and investments ===
- Zarafshon Gold Mine (Tajikistan): Zijin holds a 70% stake in the Zarafshon Joint Venture, which operates the Jilau and Taror gold mines near Panjakent. It is the largest gold producer in Tajikistan, responsible for more than 70% of the country's total output.
- Taldybulak Levoberezhny Gold Mine (Kyrgyzstan): Operated by the Altynken Joint Venture, Zijin holds a 60% stake in this project located in the Western Tianshan gold-copper belt. It is the third-largest gold mine in Kyrgyzstan with annual output of around 4 tonnes.
- Buriticá Gold Mine (Colombia): Acquired through its 2019 purchase of Continental Gold for C$1.3 billion, this high-grade underground gold project was affected by a major theft in 2023, in which 3.2 tonnes of gold were stolen by an organized group.
- Rosebel Gold Mine (Suriname): In 2022, Zijin acquired a 95% stake in Rosebel and 70% of the adjacent Saramacca mine from Iamgold for $360 million.
- Serbia Zijin Bor Copper (Serbia): Zijin purchased a 63% stake in Serbia's state-owned copper mining complex in 2018, now operating as Serbia Zijin Bor Copper. The operation includes open-pit and underground copper mines, a smelter, and refining facilities.
- Kamoa-Kakula Copper Mine (Democratic Republic of Congo): Zijin owns 49.5% of Kamoa Holding, alongside Ivanhoe Mines. It was one of the largest copper discoveries globally.
- Porgera Gold Mine (Papua New Guinea): Zijin holds a 50% interest in Barrick Niugini Limited, the operating entity of the Porgera mine.
- Aurora Gold Mine (Guyana): Acquired through the purchase of Guyana Goldfields in 2020 for approximately $238 million. The mine remains one of Guyana's largest gold operations.
- Akyem Gold Mine (Ghana): In 2024, Zijin agreed to acquire 100% ownership of the Akyem gold mine from Newmont for up to US$1 billion.
- Garatau Platinum Group Metals Mine (South Africa): Zijin owns and operates the Garatau PGMs mine in Limpopo Province and is also engaged in lithium exploration in South Africa.
- Kolwezi Copper Mine (Democratic Republic of Congo): Zijin owns a 67% stake in the COMMUS copper and cobalt mine near Kolwezi, producing over 129,000 tonnes of copper and 2,200 tonnes of cobalt in 2023.
- Norton Gold Fields (Australia): Zijin owns Norton Gold Fields, which includes the Binduli gold mine in Western Australia. The mine complex is a key asset in Zijin's Oceania portfolio.
- Bisha Polymetallic Mine (Eritrea): While Zijin does not hold equity in the operating company, it is involved in engineering, procurement, and construction (EPC) services through affiliated contractors, contributing to infrastructure development at the Bisha copper-zinc-gold mine.

=== Exploration and development ===
- Kharmagtai Copper-Gold Project (Mongolia): Zijin holds a strategic investment in Xanadu Mines and is jointly developing the Kharmagtai copper-gold project, one of Mongolia's largest undeveloped porphyry systems.
- Rio Blanco Copper-Molybdenum Project (Peru): Zijin is developing the Rio Blanco mine in northern Peru, one of the country's largest undeveloped copper-molybdenum projects, acquired as part of its long-term strategy in Latin America.
- Bankan Gold Project (Guinea): Zijin acquired a 3.5% equity stake in Predictive Discovery to support development of the Bankan Gold Project, one of West Africa's emerging large-scale deposits.
- Montage Gold (Côte d'Ivoire): In 2024, Zijin Mining supported the development of the Koné Gold Project by acquiring a 9.9% equity stake in Montage Gold and providing an additional US$125 million in project funding, including a $50 million loan facility and a $75 million gold stream. The open-pit Koné mine is expected to begin production in 2027 at a rate of 300,000 ounces of gold per year over its first eight years, with a projected mine life of 16 years.
- Neo Lithium (Argentina): Acquired 100% of Neo Lithium Corp. in 2021, gaining control of the Tres Quebradas (3Q) lithium brine project in Catamarca Province.
- Exploration in Saudi Arabia: Zijin has partnered with local companies to explore gold and base metal prospects in the Arabian Shield as part of Saudi Arabia's Vision 2030 strategy.

== Environmental incidents ==
In 2010, acid waste from a copper plant leaked into the Ting River in Fujian, causing widespread environmental damage and resulting in the criminal detention of plant officials for failing to report the spill promptly. That same year, a dam collapse at a tin mine in Guangdong caused four deaths and was attributed to extreme rainfall from a rare typhoon.

Following Zijin Mining's 2018 acquisition of RTB Bor, the city of Bor experienced repeated incidents of sulfur dioxide emissions exceeding legal limits, triggering public protests and government investigations.
