= Mačkatica mine =

Molybdenum mine in Serbia

- Location: Mačkatica, Pčinja District, Serbia
- Products: Molybdenum

The Mačkatica mine is one of the largest molybdenum mines in Serbia. The mine is located near Mačkatica in south Serbia in Pčinja District. The Mačkatica mine has reserves amounting to 181 million tonnes of molybdenum ore grading 0.07% molybdenum thus resulting 126,000 tonnes of molybdenum.

== See also ==
- List of molybdenum mines
