= Štavalj =

Štavalj Штаваљ
- Village
- Location within Serbia
- Coordinates: 43°16′N 20°07′E
- Country: Serbia
- District: Zlatibor District
- Municipality: Sjenica

Area
  - Total: 17.40 km^{2} (6.72 sq mi)
- Elevation: 1,058 m (3,471 ft)

Population (2011)
  - Total: 312
  - Density: 17.9/km^{2} (46.4/sq mi)
- Time zone: UTC+1 (CET)
  - Summer (DST): UTC+2 (CEST)

Štavalj is a village in the municipality of Sjenica, Serbia. It had a population of 312 at the 2011 census.

== Mine ==
Štavalj mine
- Coal mine wagon within the Štavalj mine

- Location within Serbia
- Location: Štavalj, Sjenica
- Products: Coal
- Opened: 1955; 71 years ago
- Company: PEU Resavica
- Website: jppeu.rs/rmu-stavalj

On the territory of Štavalj, there is an active coal mine, operated by the PEU Resavica mining company.

== Notable residents ==
- Dragi Kaličanin, football player
