= Serbia Zijin Bor Copper =

Serbian company

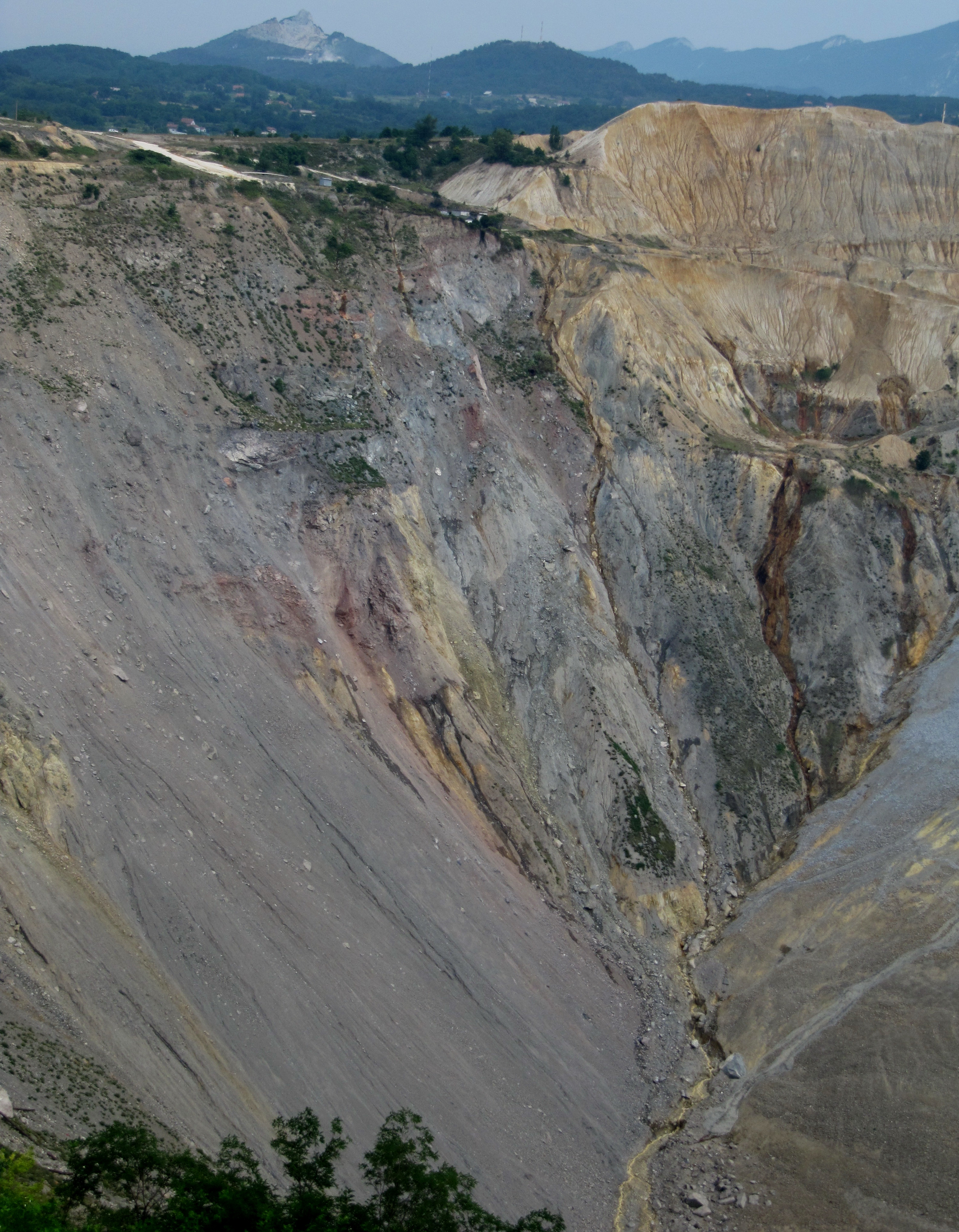
- Serbia Zijin Copper mine in Bor
- Type: d.o.o.
- Industry: Copper mining and smelting
- Founded: 18 December 2018; 7 years ago (Current form); 1904; 122 years ago (Founded)
- Headquarters: Bor, Serbia
- Area served: Worldwide
- Key people: Ximing Jian (General director); Long Yi (vice president); Shen Shaoyang (supervisory board president); Lin Hongfu (board member); Que Chaoyang (board member); Jovica Radisavljević (Execute Director of Zijin)
- Products: Copper wires, Copper bars, Gold
- Production output: 123,286 tonnes of copper; 24.055 tonnes of silver; 3.94 tonnes of gold; (2025)
- Revenue: ▲€2.224 billion (2025)
- Net income: ▲€526.42 million (2025)
- Total assets: ▲€3.955 billion (2025)
- Total equity: ▲€2.035 billion (2025)
- Owner: Zijin Mining (63%); Government of Serbia (37%)
- Number of employees: ▼5,854 (2025)
- Parent: Zijin Mining
- Subsidiaries: Copper Mine Bor; Copper Mine Majdanpek; Smelter and Refinery
- Website: zijinbor.com
- Footnotes; Business ID: 07130562; Tax ID: 100570195

Serbia Zijin Bor Copper, formerly known as RTB Bor, is a copper mining and smelting complex located in Bor, Serbia.

== History ==
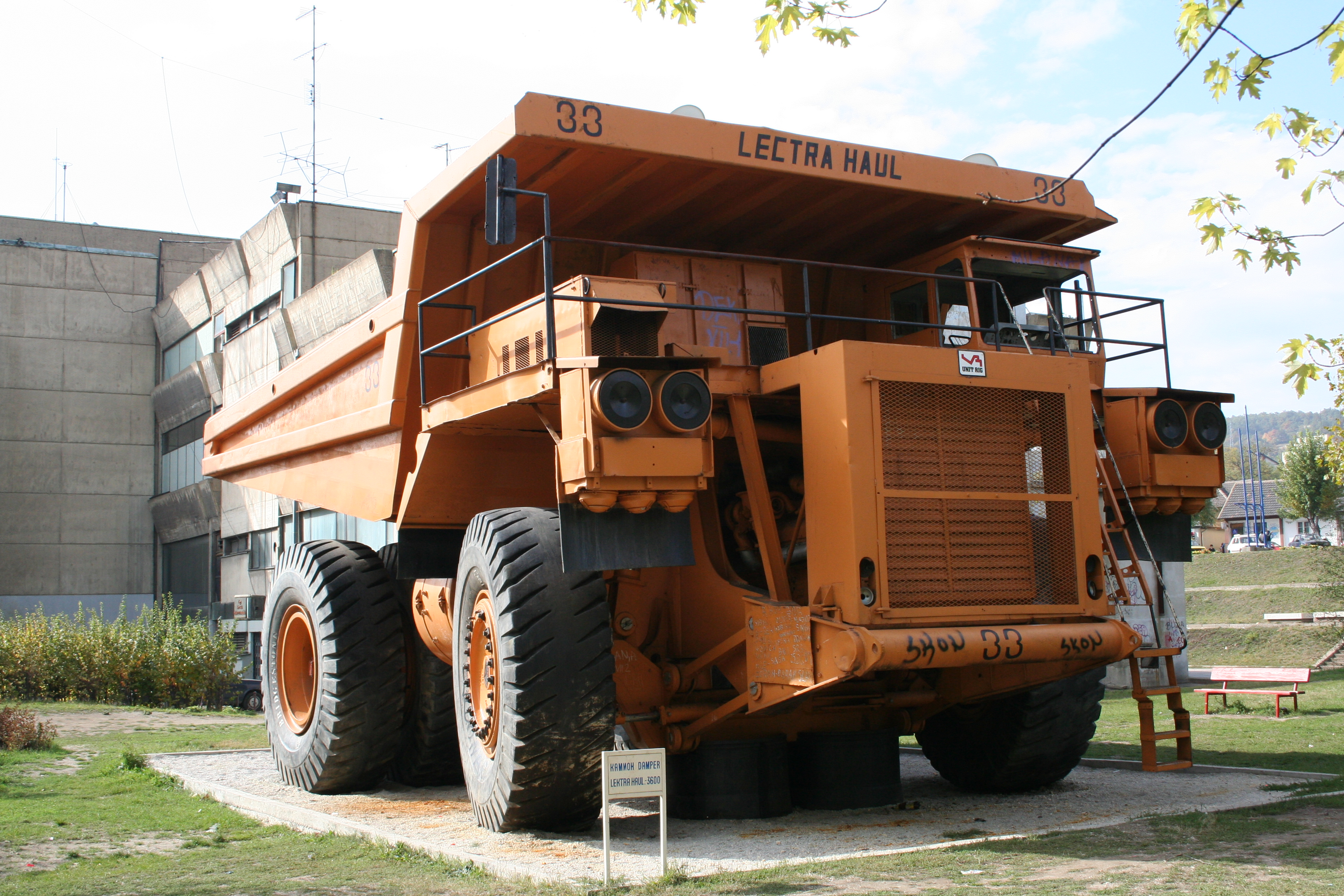
Lectra Haul dump truck in Bor.

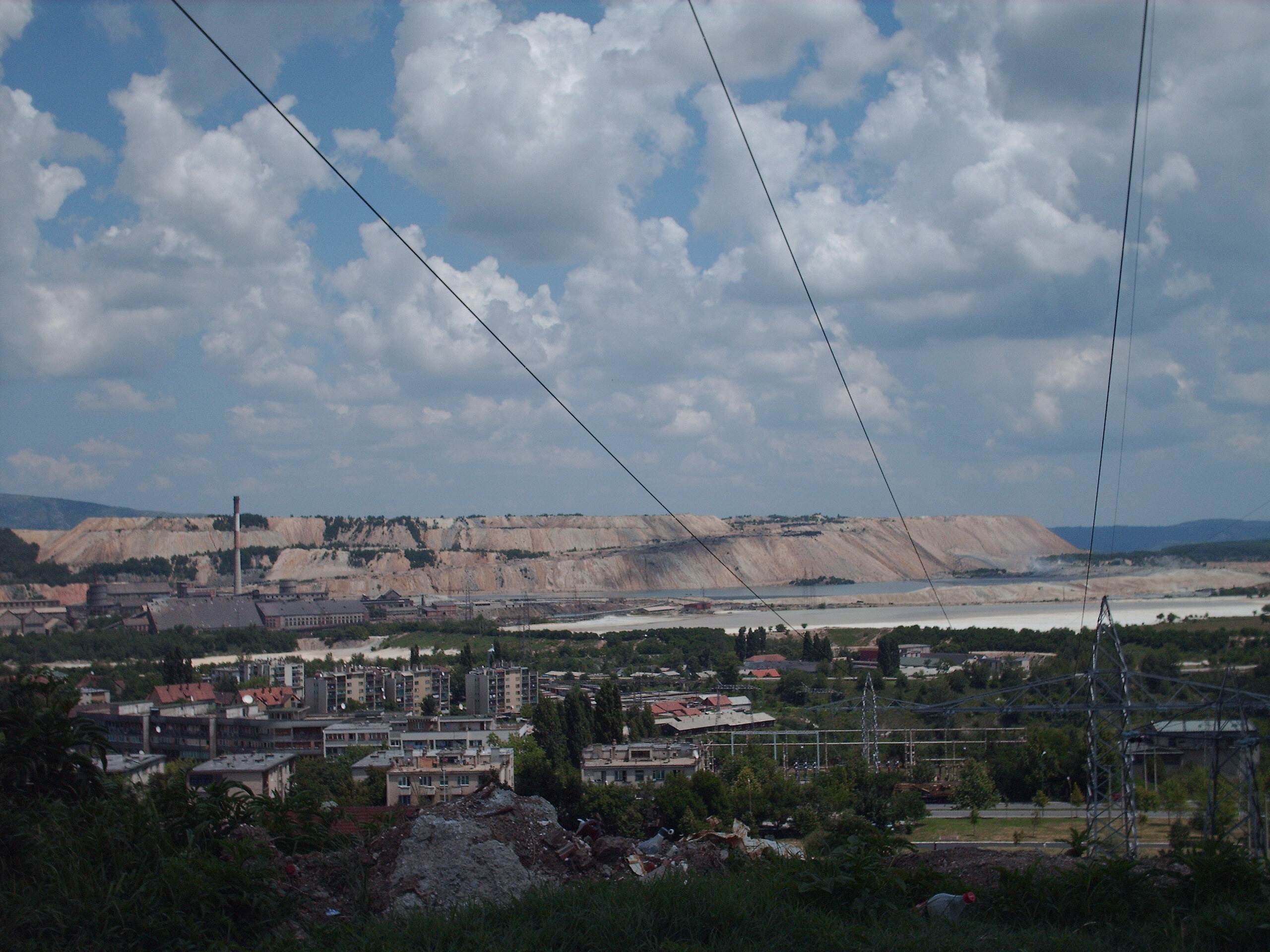
Panoramic view on RTB Bor.

=== Formation and expansion ===
The first geological explorations of copper ore in Bor area were conducted in 1897 and covered the area at the time called "Tilva Roš". The explorations were performed by the Serbian industrialist Đorđe Vajfert, who later provided investments of capital from France and set up a company called the "French Society of the Bor Mines, the Concession St. George". The company, with its headquarters in Paris, started operations on 1 June 1904. The French capital remained in Bor until the end of the World War II.

=== 1951–1988: SFR Yugoslavia ===
In 1951, the company's assets were nationalized by the Government of SFR Yugoslavia. Since then, the company Bor was in the state ownership.

From 1951 until 1988, the company has changed its organizational structure, from the "organization of associated labor" to state-owned enterprise "RTB Bor".

=== 1990s–2000s ===
During 1993, following the breakup of SFR Yugoslavia and the outbreak of the Yugoslav Wars, RTB Bor made various investments which further initiated opening of the new mining operations such as new pit mine called "Cerovo".

Since the mid-1990s and during the time of sanctions on the Federal Republic of Yugoslavia, production in the RTB Bor dropped significantly from the very prosperous 1970s and 1980s. This has been due to both diminishing reserves and the inability to obtain new equipment that would most efficiently gather the remaining ore, which is no longer of such a high grade. Copper mining as the key basis of Bor's economy had significant effects on Bor's inhabitants due to decreased production during the 1990s and 2000s.

=== 2007–2008 failed purchases ===
In March 2007, the Government of Serbia sold RTB Bor to the Romanian Cuprom for a sum of US$400 million. Cuprom pledged to modernize the production facilities in RTB Bor and Majdanpek mine, in order to improve the productivity levels. However, due to Cuprom's failure to meet a deadline regarding the financing, the Government of Serbia had cut the deal and the complex was put up for privatization once again.

In February 2008, following the second tender, RTB Bor was sold to the Austrian A-TEC for a sum of $466 million plus obligation to invest $180.4 million in facilities.

After the signing of the contract was made, the first $150 million was delivered by A-TEC. However, the problems arose after A-TEC missed its deadline for the second payment at $230 million, due to A-TEC's trouble to secure bank guarantees due to the global recession caused by the 2008 financial crisis. A-TEC was not permitted to see returned the $150 million it had already paid. The Government of Serbia later voted to scrap the contract and offer Oleg Deripaska's Strikeforce Mining and Resources (SMR) as the second ranked bidder a chance to purchase RTB Bor. However, after a set of negotiations, SMR decided not to increase their first offer and the second tender had officially failed.

=== 2008–2017 ===
For more than two decades, RTB Bor has been among the most unprofitable Serbian companies, with the accumulated debt of more than 1 billion euros. However, the Government of Serbia kept investing hundreds of millions euros in new production facilities, and even wrote off company's debts worth 1 billion euros to the government-owned companies such as Elektroprivreda Srbije.

Even with high copper prices on global markets, RTB Bor continued with financial losses. For calendar year 2015 net loss was around 110 million euros and for 2016 it amounted to 42 million euros.

In 2017, Greek Mytilineos Holdings won a multi-year trial against RTB Bor before the Geneva Arbitration Tribunal, seeking $40 million for failure to fulfill the contract and subsequent financial losses. During the 1990s, RTB Bor imported the copper concentrate from Mytilineos, processed it, but never sent back 4,000 tonnes of processed copper to the Greek company. Mytilineos has also launched several other lawsuits against RTB Bor over the non-fulfilled contracts signed during the 1990s.

In 2017, according to the general director Spaskovski, RTB Bor had a positive net result after years of net losses, with $306 million (€255 million) of revenues and $73 million (€61 million) of EBITDA. For 2017, around 18 million tonnes of ore was mined, of which 235,000 tonnes of concentrate was processed and finally, 43,000 tonnes of copper, 5 tonnes of silver and 700 kilograms of gold was obtained. Around 75% of the processed copper is exported, while the rest is being further processed by domestic copper companies "Valjaonica bakra Sevojno" and "Pometon".

=== 2017–present ===
In 2017, the Government of Serbia was obliged to find a strategic partner or buyer by March 2018, in a memorandum with the International Monetary Fund (IMF). The sale was later postponed until June 2018. Three companies – Zijin Mining from China, Diamond Fields International from Canada and U Gold from Russia – placed bids in a tender for a strategic partner. The Serbian government has chosen the Chinese Zijin Mining Group as its strategic partner for the copper mining and smelting complex, RTB Bor.

On 31 August 2018, Chinese mining company Zijin Mining took over 63% of shares of the company, in a $1.26 billion deal with the Government of Serbia. On 18 December 2018, Zijin Mining formally took over the company under new name "Zijin Bor Copper". Later, it was announced that suffix "Serbia" will be added. For 2018 calendar year, Zijin Bor Copper had net income of around 760 million euros, with most of it coming from debts conversion into shares.

== Organization ==
RTB Bor Group is composed of the following subsidies:

- RBB – Copper Mine Bor
- RBM – Copper Mine Majdanpek
- TIR – Smelter and Refinery

The ledges of the Zijin Bor Copper are located in the southwestern part of the Carpathian Mountains and are mostly of porphyry type within the Upper Bor District eruptive area. The currently undeveloped underground site "Borska Reka", located within the Jama mine, represents a very significant potential mineral resource.

The overview of total resources:

Name	Category	Amount [t]	Cu(%)	Au(%)	Ag(%)
Veliki Krivelj	A	91,713,587	0.33	0.7	0.39
Veliki Krivelj	B	333,306,825	0.35	0.7	0.39
Veliki Krivelj	C1	135,439,825	0.29	0.7	0.39
Tilva Ros	B	3,889,738	0.76	0.33	1.06
Brezanic	A	1,972,350	1.28	0.27	1.93
Borska reka	A+B+C1+C2	1,007,832,732	0.53	0.16	1.69
Cerovo complex – Cementacija 2		26,580,420	0.31	0.07	1.08
Cerovo complex – Cementacija 4		4,027,930	0.28	0.07	1.06
Cerovo complex – Cerovo		238,358,600	0.31	0.108	0.77
Main Cerovo complex – Drenovo		45,777,880	0.38	0.062	1.38
Cerovo complex – Kraku Bukaresku		1,600,000	0.62	0.62	2.21

== Criticism ==
=== Air pollution ===
Several protests has been held in Bor in eastern Serbia over excessive air pollution that has been intensified since Zijin took over copper miner Rudarsko-Topioničarski Basen (RTB) in late 2018. Since January 2019, Bor has been struggling with excessive air pollution, with sulfur dioxide (SO2) levels topping 2,000 micrograms per cubic meter, up from the maximum allowed 350. Protesters demanded that the city government urgently adopt a plan so that the line ministry and state inspectorates can react to the alarming pollution levels in Bor. As early as April 2019, the inspector had ordered the company to take action against air pollution of the environment, human health and the environment, because it emitted excessive SO2. Zijin then explained in a letter to the Ministry of Environment that the power outage had caused pollution. However, control a few months later, in August, showed another omission – Zijin did not have a system for wet dust removal during the transportation of tailings on the Bor mine, which also threatened human health and the environment. Zijin was ordered to solve the problem, and the company later told the Ministry that a dust suppression system had been installed, which was put to trial. In November 2019, CINS sought an interview with Zijin on the topic of air pollution, to which the company responded with a press release. It says that by the end of the year, the company will have a total of five SO2-neutralized dust spray machines. Documentation obtained by CINS shows that by that time, two of the machines purchased had been in operation for about two months, but pollution data showed that it had no significant effect on the reduction of sulfur dioxide.

== Gallery ==
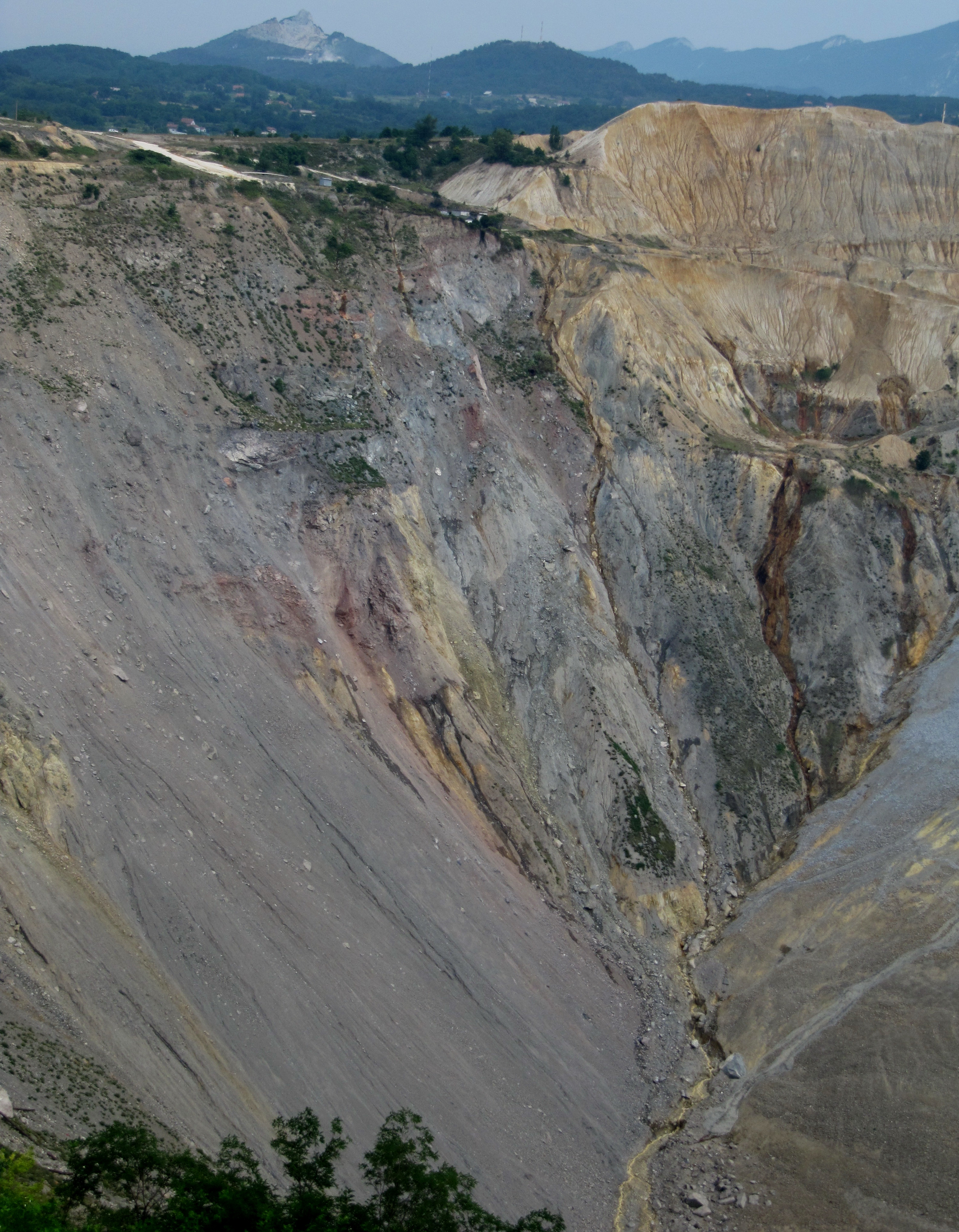
Bor mine

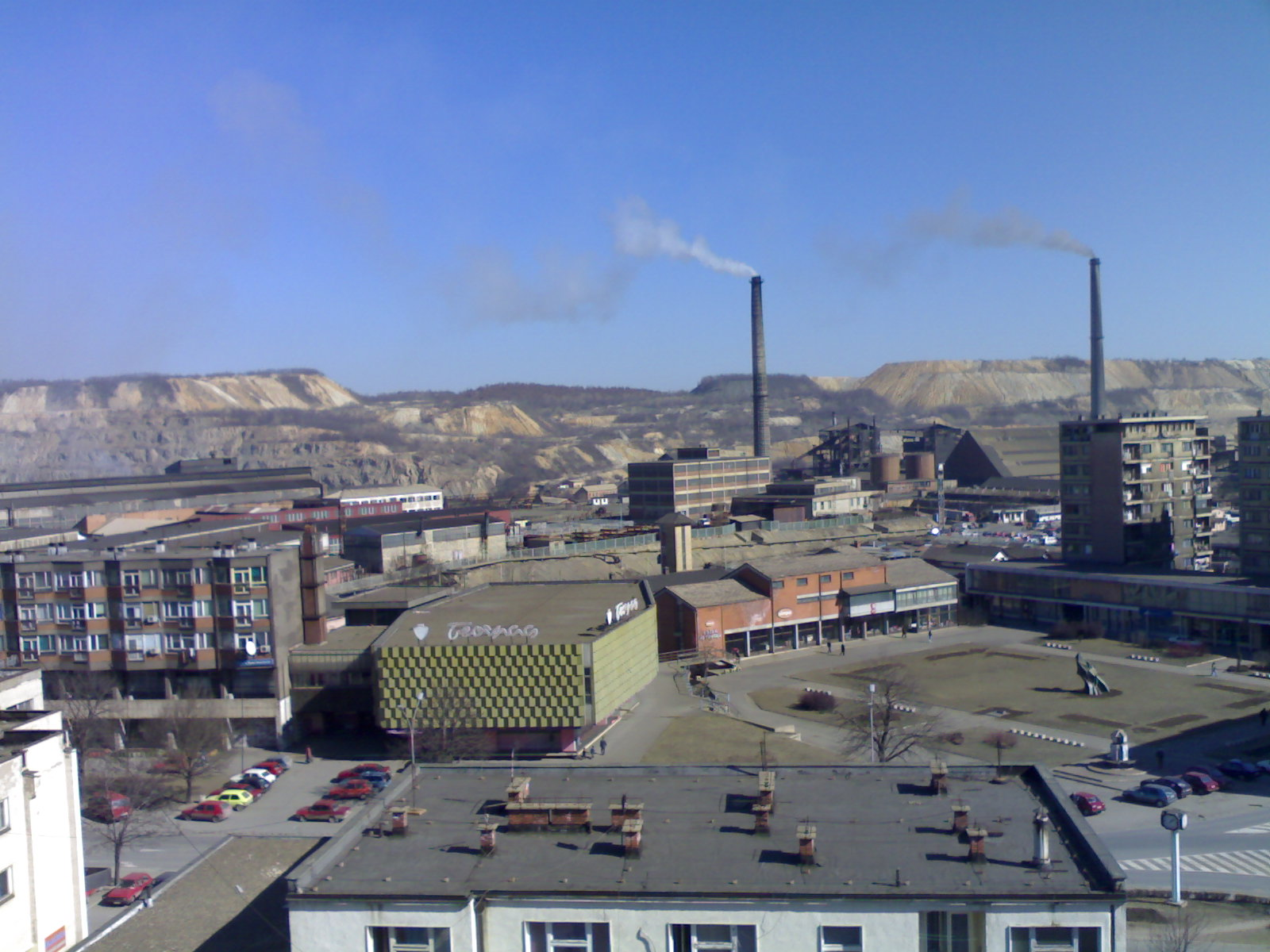
View on RTB Bor from town

== See also ==
- List of copper production by company
- Valjaonica bakra Sevojno
- Bor mine
- Borska Reka mine
- Dumitru Potok mine
- Mali Krivelj mine
- Majdanpek mine
- Veliki Krivelj mine
