= Mokra Gora mine =

Nickel mine in Serbia

- Location: Mokra Gora, Zlatibor District, Serbia
- Products: Nickel

The Mokra Gora mine is one of the largest nickel mines in Serbia. The mine is located near Mokra Gora village (within the Zlatibor District) on Zlatibor mountain. The mine has reserves amounting to 1 billion tonnes of ore grading 0.7% nickel metal.
