= Kiseljak mine =

Copper mine in Serbia

- Location: Jablanica District, Serbia
- Products: Copper

The Kiseljak mine is a large copper mine located in the south of Serbia in Jablanica District. Kiseljak represents one of the largest copper reserve in Serbia and in the world having estimated reserves of 300.5 million tonnes of ore grading 0.27% copper.
