= Metovnica =

- Village
- Location within Serbia
- Coordinates: 43°57′35″N 22°08′39″E
- Country: Serbia
- District: Bor District
- Municipality: Bor

Population (2022)
  - Total: 775
- Time zone: UTC+1 (CET)
  - Summer (DST): UTC+2 (CEST)
- Postal code: 19204
- Area code: 019

Metovnica (Serbian Cyrillic: Метовница) is a village in the municipality of Bor, Serbia. According to the 2022 census, the village has a population of 775 people.
