= Veluće mine =

Cobalt mine in Veluće, Rasina, Serbia

- Interactive map of Veluće mine
- Location: Veluće, Rasina District, Serbia
- Products: Cobalt

The Veluće mine is one of the largest cobalt mines in Serbia. The mine is located in Veluće in Rasina District. The mine has reserves amounting to 3 million tonnes of ore grading 0.08% cobalt.
