= Mačkatica =

- Village
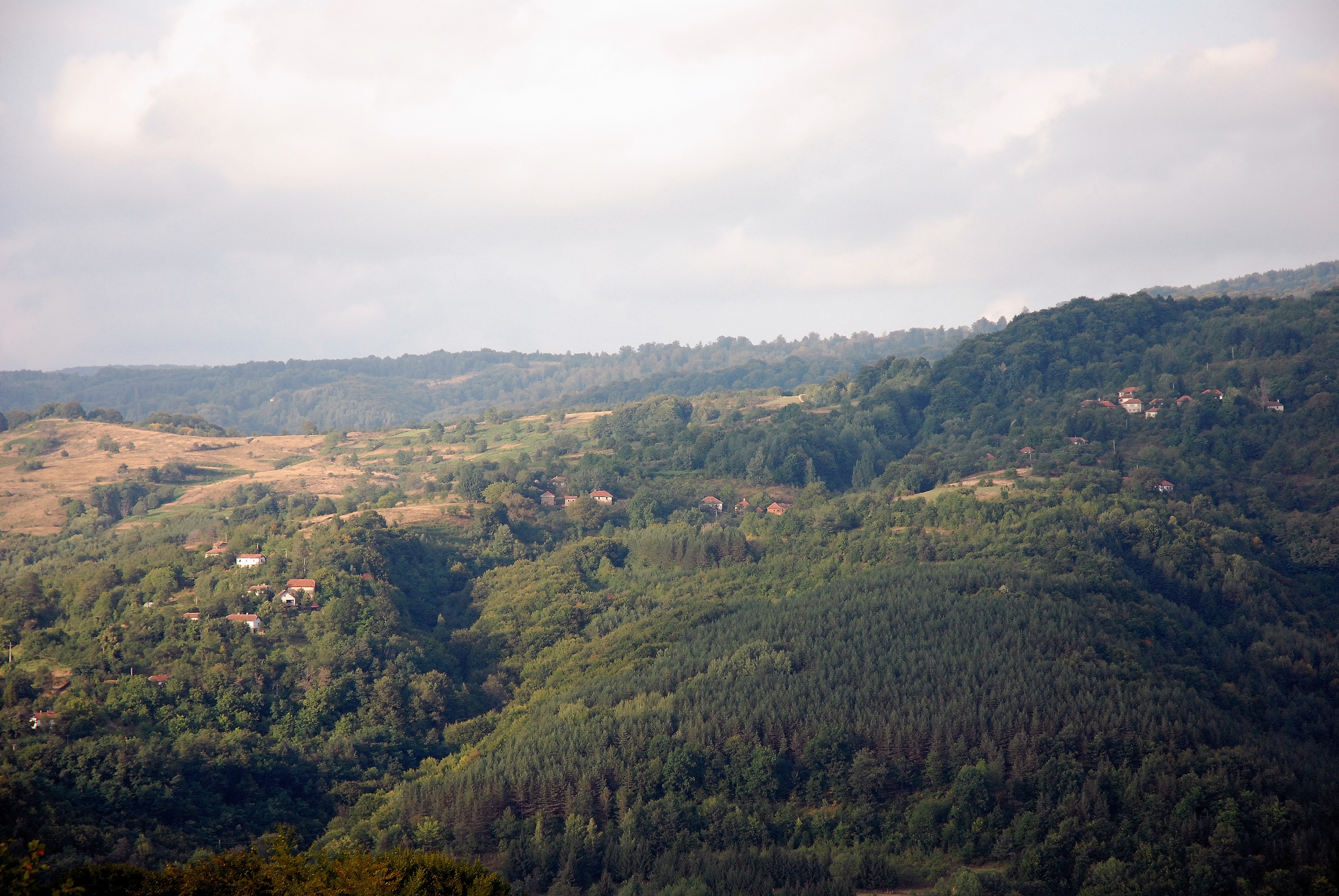

- Location within Serbia
- Coordinates: 42°45′27″N 22°10′33″E
- Country: Serbia
- District: Pčinja District
- Municipality: Surdulica

Population (2002)
  - Total: 259
- Time zone: UTC+1 (CET)
  - Summer (DST): UTC+2 (CEST)

Mačkatica is a village in the municipality of Surdulica, Serbia. According to the 2002 census, the village has a population of 259 people.
