= Veliki Krivelj mine =

Copper Mine

- Location: Veliki Krivelj, Bor, Bor District, Serbia
- Products: Copper
- Company: Dejan Mitić (manager mine); Nemanja Aničić (technically); Predrag Golubović (technically)

The Veliki Krivelj mine is a large copper mine located in the east of Serbia in Bor District. Veliki Krivelj represents one of the largest copper reserves in Serbia and in the world, having estimated reserves of 560.5 million tonnes of ore grading 0.33% copper.

== See also ==
- RTB Bor
