= Mali Krivelj mine =

Copper mine in Serbia

- Location: Bor District, Serbia
- Products: Copper

The Mali Krivelj mine is a large copper mine located in the east of Serbia in Bor District. Mali Krivelj represents one of the largest copper reserve in Serbia and in the world having estimated reserves of 300 million tonnes of ore grading 0.5% copper.

== See also ==
- RTB Bor
