= Dumitru Potok mine =

Copper mine in Serbia

- Location: Bor District, Serbia
- Products: Copper

The Dumitru Potok mine is a large copper mine located in the east of Serbia in Bor District. Dumitru Potok represents one of the largest copper reserve in Serbia and in the world having estimated reserves of 790 million tonnes of ore grading 0.2% copper.

== See also ==
- RTB Bor
