= Surdulica mine =

Molybdenum mine in Serbia

- Location: Surdulica, Pčinja District, Serbia
- Products: Molybdenum

The Surdulica mine is one of the largest molybdenum mines in Serbia. The mine is located near Surdulica in south Serbia in Pčinja District. The Surdulica mine has reserves amounting to 125 million tonnes of molybdenum ore grading 0.05% molybdenum thus resulting 62,500 tonnes of molybdenum.

== See also ==
- List of molybdenum mines
