= Majdanpek mine =

Mine in Serbia

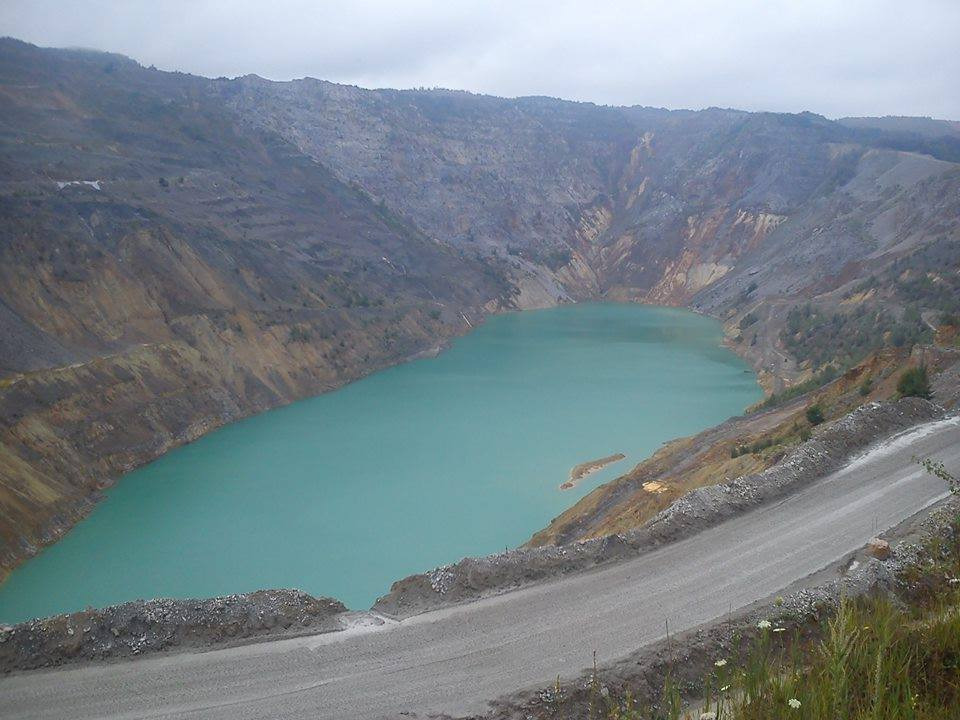
- View on Majdanpek mine pit, May 2017

- Location within Serbia
- Location: Majdanpek, Serbia; 44°24′43″N 21°55′56″E
- Products: Copper, Gold, Silver
- Opened: 1961; 65 years ago
- Company: Serbia Zijin Bor Copper

The Majdanpek mine is a large copper mine located near the town of Majdanpek, east Serbia. It is operated by the Chinese-owned Serbia Zijin Bor Copper.

The mine represents one of the largest porphyry copper reserves in Serbia and in the world, having estimated reserves of 619.5 million tonnes of ore grading 0.33% copper. It also has gold reserves amounting to 7.68 million oz and silver reserves of 56 million oz.
