= Borska Reka mine =

Mine in Serbia

- Location: Bor District, Serbia
- Products: Copper, Gold, Silver

The Borska Reka mine is a large copper mine located in the east of Serbia in Bor District. Borska Reka represents one of the largest copper reserve in Serbia and in the world having estimated reserves of 1 billion tonnes of ore grading 0.53% copper. The mine also has gold reserves amounting to 4.4 million oz and 36.3 million oz of silver.

== See also ==
- RTB Bor
