= Ruđinci =

- Village (Selo)
- Location within Serbia
- Coordinates: 43°37′16″N 20°54′58″E
- Country: Serbia
- District: Raška District
- Municipality: Vrnjačka Banja

Area
  - Total: 11.62 km^{2} (4.49 sq mi)
- Elevation: 207 m (679 ft)

Population (2011)
  - Total: 2,466
  - Density: 212.2/km^{2} (549.6/sq mi)
- Time zone: UTC+1 (CET)
  - Summer (DST): UTC+2 (CEST)

Ruđinci is a village in the municipality of Vrnjačka Banja, Serbia. According to the 2011 census, the village has a population of 2,466 people.
