= Donja Ljubata mine =

Graphite mine in Serbia

- Location: Donja Ljubata, Pčinja District, Serbia
- Products: Graphite

The Donja Ljubata mine is one of the largest graphite mines in Serbia. The mine is located in Donja Ljubata in Pčinja District. The mine has reserves amounting to 5.88 million tonnes of ore grading 3.4% graphite metal.
