= Second Serbian–Ottoman War =

Conflict between Serbia and the Ottoman Empire (1877–1878)

- Part of the Serbian–Ottoman Wars (1876–1878)
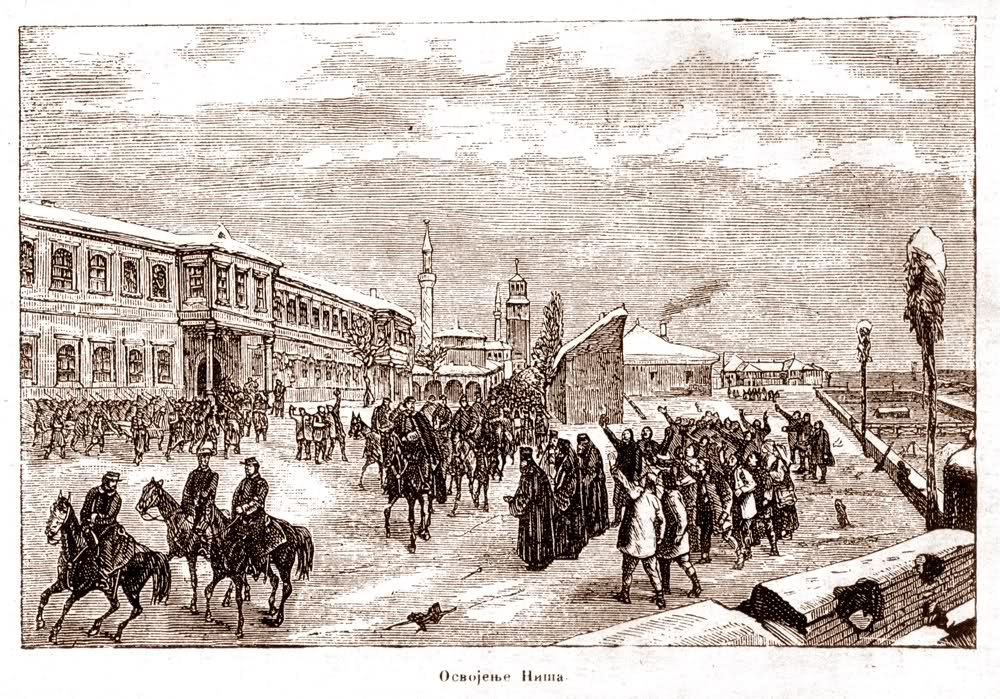
- Liberation of Niš
Date	13 December 1877 – 5 February 1878 (1 month, 3 weeks and 2 days)
Location	Principality of Serbia
Result	Serbian victory: Expulsion of Albanians and Turks from Serbia; The Russo-Turkish War of 1877–1878 draws to an end; Ottoman control over the Balkans is broken
Territorial changes	Serbia de jure gets independence from the Ottoman Empire

Belligerents
Serbia; Montenegro	Ottoman Empire

Commanders and leaders
(Principality of Serbia) Milan I of Serbia; (Principality of Serbia) Đura Horvatović; (Principality of Serbia) Sava Grujić; (Principality of Serbia) Ranko Alimpić; (Principality of Serbia) Milojko Lešjanin; (Principality of Serbia) Jovan Belimarković	(Ottoman Empire) Hafiz Pasha; (Ottoman Empire) Ziya Pasha; (Ottoman Empire) Rashid Pasha; (Ottoman Empire) Mehmed Ali

Strength
89,000 soldiers with 232 guns	85,000 soldiers and several thousand Bashi-bazouks

Casualties and losses
708 killed, 159 missing, 2,999 wounded, 1,534 died out of combat	3,400 killed, 4,000 wounded, 1,750 prisoners of war

The Second Serbian-Ottoman War was a conflict fought between the Principality of Serbia and the Ottoman Empire. It lasted from 13 December 1877 to 5 February 1878, and followed the First Serbian–Ottoman War. Serbia waged a successful campaign during which the Serbian army reached Kosovo, Čukarica and Kyustendil within a few weeks. Thanks to these military successes, Serbia gained their long-awaited de jure independence, as well as the districts of Vranje, Toplica, Niš, and Pirot.

== Prelude ==
After the failure in the First Serbian–Ottoman War, there was great dissatisfaction in Serbia due to the impoverishment of the population, which was worsened by a bad harvest, taxes to cover state expenses, and the suppression of political freedoms. Still, there was sympathy for the beginning of the Russo-Turkish war in spring 1877 and cautious alignment with Russia, which advised restraint. When the Russians were stopped by the Turks near Pleven in Bulgaria, Russia requested Serbia to enter the war. Russia provided significant financial aid to Serbia, so by late September, Serbia deployed 25–30 thousand soldiers to its southeastern borders, and the army was strengthened in arms and equipment.

Colonel Sava Grujić, Minister of the Army, reorganized the Serbian army into five corps:

- Šumadija Corps, with 15,500 fighters and 146 officers;
- Morava Corps, with 18,450 fighters and 118 officers;
- Timok Corps, with 22,150 soldiers and 124 officers;
- Javor Corps, with 13,100-15,000 soldiers and 66 officers; and
- Drina Corps, with 12,350-19,000 fighters and 54 officers.

At the beginning of the war, a special Timok-Zaječar army was formed with 8,800 fighters. Serbia entered the war against Turkey with 89,000 soldiers and 232 artillery pieces, while Turkey had 85,000 regular soldiers and several thousand irregulars such as bashi-bazouks and Arnauts.

The Prime Minister from 1876 to 1878 was Stevča Mihailović, and the Minister of Foreign Affairs was Jovan Ristić.

== Topola mutiny ==
One battalion of the Kragujevac Brigade of the 2nd Šumadija Division mutinied on 7 December 1877 and refused to go to the front. Soldiers from Kragujevac went to Topola, hoping that other battalions would join them and that Petar I Karađorđević supporters would lead them to overthrow Prince Milan Obrenović and abandon the war. This was an attempt by the Karađorđević faction to stage a coup in Serbia. The mutiny was suppressed bloodlessly on 11 December, the mutineers were arrested and severely punished. A military tribunal convicted all but four of the seventy accused; twenty-three were sentenced to death and seven wound up executed by firing squad in Aranđelovac on 31 May 1878.

== Goals, plans, and preparations ==
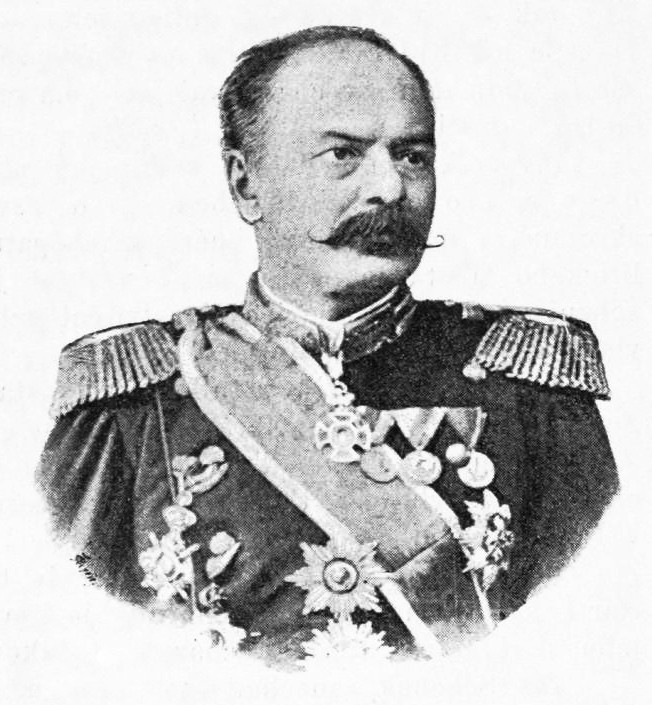
General Belimarković

The goal of this war was the same as in the First Serbian-Ottoman War: liberation of the Serbian people from Ottoman rule and territorial expansion towards the south. The Serbian military plan was based on the fact that Serbia, under pressure from the Great Powers, could not claim Bosnia, and Russia requested Serbia to assist its army advancing towards southern Bulgaria. Based on these facts, the war plan foresaw that three out of five Serbian corps (Šumadija under General Jovan Belimarković, Morava under Colonel Milojko Lešjanin, and Timok under Colonel Đura Horvatović) with around 46,000 soldiers and 128 artillery pieces would attack south and southeast, encircle Niš, capture Babina Glava, Bela Palanka, and Pirot, and continue advancing towards Sofia to support the Russian army. The Drina Corps, commanded by General Ranko Alimpić, was to defend against Bosnia, and the Javor Corps under Colonel Nikolić was to attack from defense towards Novi Pazar and Sjenica. The Timok-Zaječar army under Colonel Zdravković was to attack and capture Kula and Vidin.

The Ottoman war plan envisioned stubborn defense on all fronts, with many points in the valleys of the rivers Nišava, South Morava, Raška, and Ibar well fortified, with the strongest fortifications at Niš, Novi Pazar, and Pirot.

== Course of the war ==
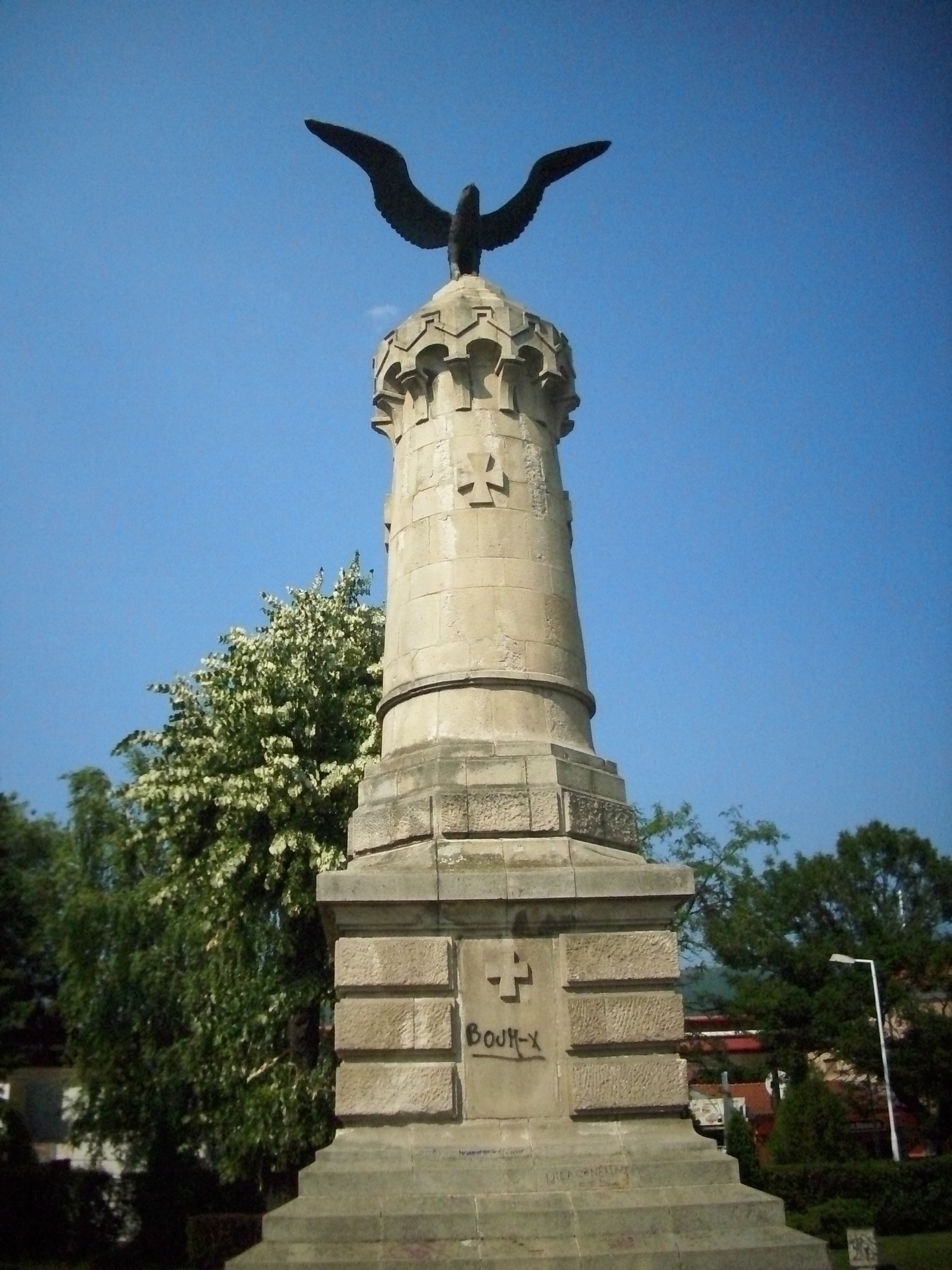
Monument in the center of Pirot dedicated to Captain Milutin Karanović and others who fell on 12, 13, and 15 December 1877 during the liberation of Upper Ponishavlje from the Turks

War was declared on Turkey on 13 December, and military operations began on 15 December with an advance of three Serbian divisions (Ibar, Morava, and Danube) south to encircle Niš. This operation was executed precisely and Niš was completely encircled in just five days. To prevent reinforcements from Kosovo reaching the besieged city, Colonel Lešjanin ordered the Ibar division to capture Kuršumlija and strategic points Samokovo and Prepolac that cut off the route Priština–Prokuplje–Niš. Units under Colonel Stevan Binički captured Kuršumlija after two days of heavy fighting on 17 December. This opened the route for the Serbian troops to advance further south.

At the same time, the Morava Corps advanced towards Niš from the north, capturing the villages of Donja Vrežina and Gornja Vrežina, and cutting off Ottoman communications with the south. The Timok Corps moved from the east, closing the ring around Niš. By 19 December, the Serbian army had successfully encircled Niš, which was the key Ottoman stronghold in the region. The siege of Niš lasted until 12 January 1878, when Serbian forces launched a decisive assault. After intense fighting, the city was captured, marking a major victory. The fall of Niš was a turning point in the war and opened the way for the liberation of other southern territories.

Following the capture of Niš, the Serbian army continued its advance towards Pirot and Vranje. The battle for Pirot ended on 14 January 1878 with the town's liberation, and on 26 January, Vranje was freed from Ottoman control.

The fighting continued sporadically until the signing of the Treaty of San Stefano on 3 March 1878, which ended hostilities and recognized Serbia’s expanded territory and independence.

== Aftermath and legacy ==
The Second Serbian-Turkish War resulted in the liberation of large parts of southern Serbia. Following the signing of the Treaty of San Stefano, Serbia gained the strategic districts of Vranje, Toplica, Niš, and Pirot. Serbia gained full international recognition as an independent state at the Congress of Berlin later that year.

The war solidified the position of the Obrenović dynasty and enhanced Prince Milan’s prestige. It also laid the groundwork for further national consolidation and territorial expansion in the years to come.

== Sources ==
- Srejović, Dragoslav; Gavrilović, Slavko; Ćirković, Sima M., eds. (1981). Istorija srpskog naroda: knj. Od Prvog ustanka do Berlinskog kongresa, 1804-1878. Srpska književna zadruga.
- "On the Centenary of the birth of GENERAL SAVA GRUJIĆ, SOLDIER AND POLITICIAN", Politika, 20 May 1940, Belgrade, p. 8.
