= Nikola Ziković =

Serbian revolutionary

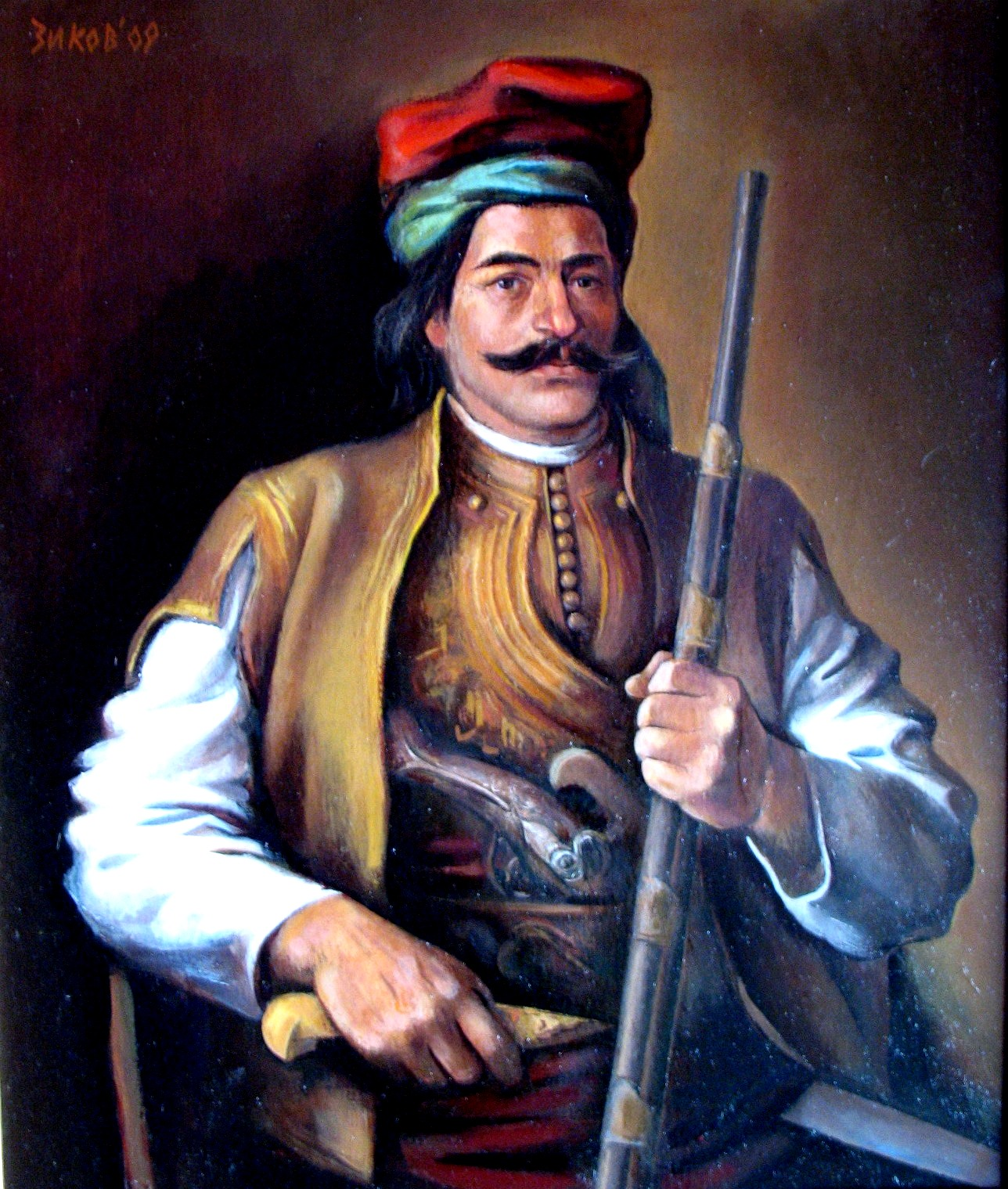
Portrait of Nikola Šišmanović.

Nikola Šišmanović (Serbian: Никола Шишмановић, 1781–1837) was a Serbian revolutionary who participated in the First Serbian Uprising and Second Serbian Uprising as a soldier (vojnik). He was born in a trading family in Gornji Matejevac near Niš, where his parents settled after coming from Vidin. As a boy, Šišmanović learned the craft of weaving, and after the death of his father, he opened his own shop. Upon hearing about the then ongoing Slaughter of the Knezes in late January 1804, Šišmanović joined the Serbian rebels against the Dahije, leading a četa (company) of volunteers from his village. He distinguished himself in the battles of Kamenica, and at Čegar in the trench crew under vojvoda of the Resava nahija Stevan Sinđelić. The First Serbian Uprising was suppressed by the Ottomans in 1813. He joined the Second uprising under vojvoda Miloš Obrenović in 1815. After Prince Miloš reorganized the principality at the end of 1821 and appointed Joksim Milosavljević as the great serdar of the Danube region, Šišmanović returned to a peaceful life in Gornji Matejevac where he died in 1837.

He had two sons, Miloš who fought under vojvoda Hajduk Veljko of the Krajina nahija and Stojko who participated in Miloje Đak's rebellion and Srndak's Niš rebellion.

== Sources ==
- Nenadović, Matija (1867). Memoari. Belgrade: U Drž. knjigopečatnji – via Google Books.
