= Vujić =

Vujić (Serbian: Вујић) is a Serbo-Croatian surname, a patronymic derived from the masculine given name Vuja, a diminutive of the name Vuk (meaning "wolf"). The surname has been historically anglicized into Vuyich, Vuyitch, Vuich. In Hungary, the surname is written Vujity, though still pronounced as in Serbo-Croatian.

== Notable people ==
Vujić

- Joakim Vujić (1772–1847), Serbian writer, dramatist, actor, traveler and polyglot

- Statuette of Joakim Vujić (Statueta Joakim Vujić), Award of the Knjaževsko-srpski teatar from Kragujevac, Serbia
- The Ring with figure of Joakim Vujić (Prsten sa likom Joakima Vujića), Award of the Knjaževsko-srpski teatar from Kragujevac, Serbia

- Mihailo Vujić (1853–1913), Serbian economist, politician and minister
- Antun Vujić (born 1945), Croatian politician, philosopher, political analyst and lexicographer
- Ivana "Ivy" Vujic (born 1983), Serbian-born Canadian bassist, member of Kittie
- Marko Vujic (born 1984), Bosnian-born Austrian footballer
- Jasmina Vujic, Serbian-born American professor of nuclear engineering

Vuich

- Rose Ann Vuich (1927–2001), Serbian-American politician

== See also ==
- FK Vujić Voda, a football club based in Valjevo, Serbia
- Vujičić
- Vujčić
