= Pantelej neighbourhood, Niš =

Pantelej (Serbian Cyrillic: Пaнтeлej) is a neighborhood of the city of Niš, Serbia. It is located in Niš municipality of Pantelej.

== Location ==
Pantelej is located in the north-eastern outskirt of Niš. It is flat and bordered on the south by the Nišava river, on the east by the neighborhood of Durlan, and on the west by the neighborhood of Jagodin Mala.

== History ==
Pantelej was named by the Church of St. Pantelejmon, which was built after the liberation of Niš from Ottomans. The area around the church is significantly older, with human remains from a medieval necropolis dating to the 12th century. According to Stefan the First-Crowned, the conquest of Niš by Nemanja in 1185 AD implied the total destruction of the city, but some of the churches were spared. Next to the church is Pantelejmon Cemetery, atop the former necropolis, which was formed at the end of the 19th century and continued to be used for burials until the end of the 1940s.

== Characteristics ==
The neighborhood is mostly residential.

== Future development ==
There is a plan of construction of a new city park in the neighborhood.
