= Vujčić =

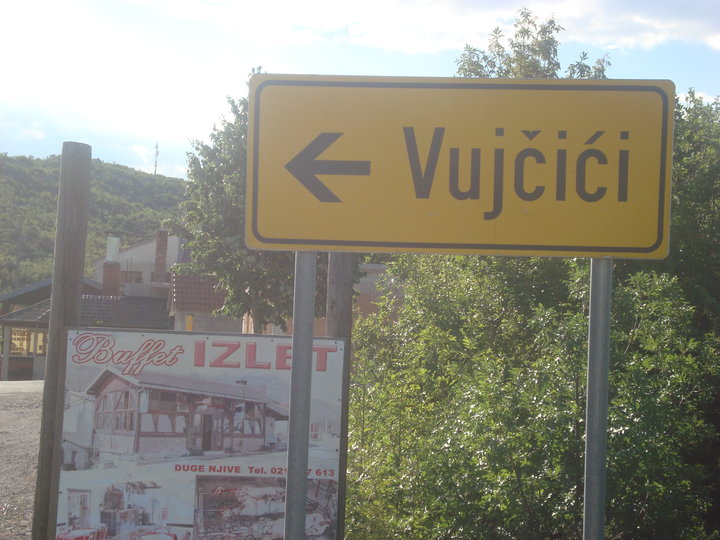
- A village named Vujčići in Makarska. The i makes the surname plural.
- Pronunciation: [ʋûːjtʃitɕ]

Origin
- Language: Serbian
- Region of origin: Montenegro, Serbia, Herzegovina, Bosnia

Vujčić (Cyrillic: Вујчић; pronounced [ʋûːjtʃitɕ];) is a surname.

According to Jovan Cvijić and Jovan Erdeljanović, until the first appearance of the dictionary of Vuk Karadžić in 1867, the surname was referred to as Vuičić. At the turn of the 20th century, some registered the name as Vujičić while others as Vujčić hence today's two separate last names. Karadžić used the letter j as a borrowed letter from the Latin alphabet.

The first Vujčić is mentioned in the year 1518 around Serbia's capital Belgrade. The first mention of the Vujčić family as a tribe is in 1541 in the nahija of Zmijanje near Banja Luka where even today there are people with this surname. After this, there were migrations to Herzegovina, Montenegro then to Raška and Sjenica. After the Battle of Čegar in 1809, fearing revenge from the Ottoman Turks, the Vujčićs followed Karađorđe Petrović for the then-empty Šumadija. Karađorđe himself decided who of them would live in which area.

Serbs have been documented in Croatia from as early as the year 1600 as frontiersmen (graničari). There the surname Vuičić was also documented. The first Vujčić family in Croatia hails from the village of Kusonje. The surname also has roots from the Morača canyon in Montenegro where the surname shares kinship (svojta) with the surnames Đalović, Radović and Femić.

In 2010, Frankfurt-based Serbian language newspaper Vesti reported that the first Vujčić appeared in 1790 in Čurug and in Gospođinci in 1852.

== Notable people ==
- Nikola Vujčić (born 1956), Serbian poet
- Prvoslav Vujčić (born 1960), Serbian Canadian author
- Zoran Vujčić (born 1961), Croatian footballer
- Boris Vujčić (born 1964), Croatian bank governor
- Nikola Vujčić (born 1978), Croatian basketball player and team manager of Maccabi Tel Aviv
- Stephan Vujčić (born 1986), German footballer of Croatian descent
- Daniel Vujčić (born 1995), Slovenian footballer
- Nikša Vujčić (born 1998), Serbian footballer
