= Battle of Čegar =

Battle of the First Serbian Uprising

- Part of First Serbian Uprising
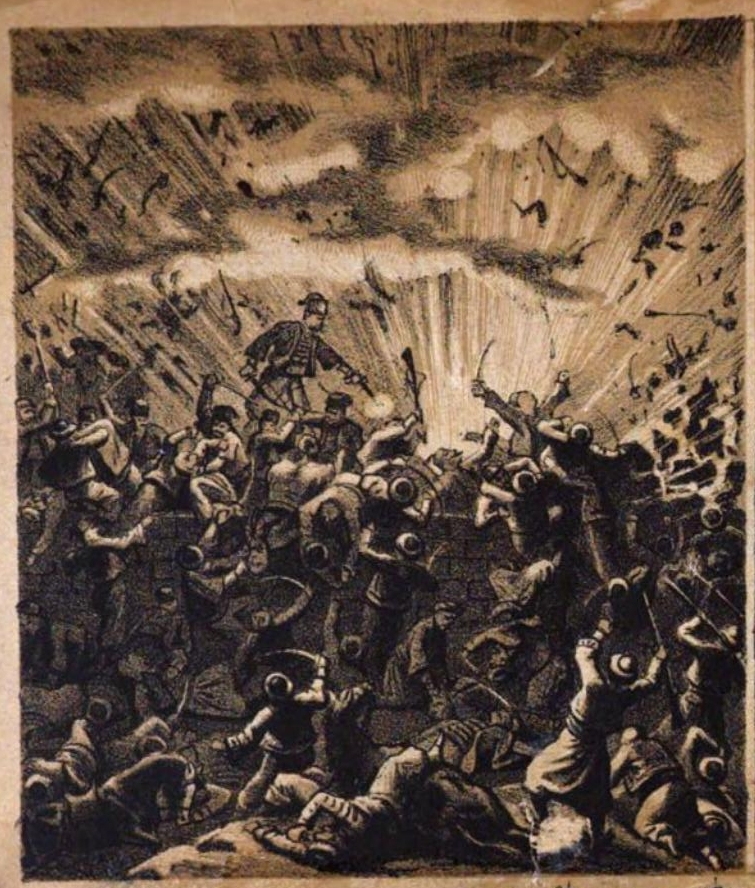
- Sinđelić blowing up the powder kegs at the Čegar hill.
Date	31 May 1809
Location	Čegar, Sanjak of Niš, Ottoman Empire
Result	Ottoman victory

Belligerents
Revolutionary Serbia	Ottoman Empire

Commanders and leaders
Stevan Sinđelić ‡‡; Petar Dobrnjac; Miloje Petrovic; Ilija Barjaktarović; Paulj Matejić; Veljko Petrović	Hurshid Pasha; Ismail Bey; Mustafa Pasha

Units involved
(Revolutionary Serbia) First Serbian Army	(Ottoman Empire) Ottoman Army

Strength
16,000 infantry 2,000 cavalry 11 guns	30,000–35,000

Casualties and losses
~ 4,000 killed	c. 10,000 killed

The Battle of Čegar (Serbian: Битка на Чегру/Bitka na Čegru), also known as the Battle of Kamenica (Бој на Каменици/Boj na Kamenici) took place during the First Serbian Uprising between the Serbian Revolutionaries and Ottoman forces near the Niš Fortress on 31 May 1809. Fought on the Čegar hill situated between the villages of Donji Matejevac and Kamenica near Niš in what is today southeastern Serbia, it ended in an Ottoman victory. Commander Stevan Sinđelić famously blew up the gunpowder magazine when the Ottomans overtook his trench, killing everyone in it. Skulls of dead Serb rebels were embedded into the Skull Tower.

== Background ==
On April 15, 1809, the 10,000 Serbian rebels approached the villages of Kamenica, Donji and Gornji Matejevac, near the Fortress of Niš with Miloje Petrović as Commander-in-chief. They made six trenches. The first and the biggest one was on Čegar Hill in charge of vojvoda Stevan Sinđelić. The second one was in the village Gornji Matejevac with Petar Dobrnjac as the commander. The third trench was north-east to Kamenica with vojvoda Ilija Barjaktarović. The fourth trench was in Kamenica with Miloje Petrović as the chief commander. The fifth trench was in the mountain above Kamenica and under the control of vojvoda Paulj Matejić while the sixth one was in Donji Matejevac. The Ottoman commander of the fortress was Hurshid Pasha who had 8,000 troops in the fort and the surrounding area. The Serbs then launched several attacks against the Niš Fortress, but they could not take the fort due to lack of heavy artillery. In such circumstances, their strategy was to force Hursid Pasha to surrender with the long siege. But Hurshid had different tactics; after every Serbian attack, he offered negotiations and this way he bought time while fresh troops arrived.

Meanwhile, on 20 May the Ottoman army was reinforced with 20,000 soldiers from Rumelia. One Ottoman unit then tried to surround the Serbian troops, 30 km east of the town. Hajduk-Veljko and his 2,000 soldiers then left their position, and moved to prevent the Ottoman attack from their rear approach. This manoeuvre further weakened Serbian positions on the main front line.

The Ottoman troops attacked on the trench of Petar Dobrnjac on 30 May. The following day, on 31 May 1809, the most prominent trench at Čegar Hill, under the command of Stevan Sinđelić, was under attack.

== Battle ==
The battle lasted for the whole day. Stevan and his unit became separated from the remainder of the Serb guerrilla positions and he and his men resisted fiercely. With hundreds of Ottoman soldiers pouring into the trench, Stevan saw that his Brigade had little hope of staving off the Ottoman offensive. Hand-to-hand combat ensued in the trenches. Stevan decided to fire his flintlock pistol into a pile of gunpowder kegs. When the Ottomans swarmed the trench from all sides and headed for him, Sinđelić squeezed the trigger. As Milovan Kukić witnessed:

"The Ottoman troops attacked five times, and the Serbs managed to repulse them five times. Each time their losses were great. Some of the Ottoman troops attacked, and some of them went ahead, and thus when they attacked for the sixth time they filled the trenches with their dead so that the alive went over their dead bodies and they began to fight against the Serbs with their bayonets, cutting and stabbing their enemies. The Serbian soldiers from the other trenches cried out to help Stevan. But there was no help, either because they could not help without their cavalry, or because Miloje Petrović did not allow it. When Stevan Sinđelić saw that the Ottoman troops had taken over the trench, he ran to the powder cave, took out his gun, and fired into the powder magazine. The ensuing explosion was so powerful that all of the surroundings were shaken, and the whole trench was caught in a cloud of dense smoke. Everyone that was in the trench was killed, as was everyone in the vicinity of it."

It was earlier believed that the Serbian defeat at Kamenica was due to Miloje Trnavac, a commander of the Niš front.

== Aftermath ==
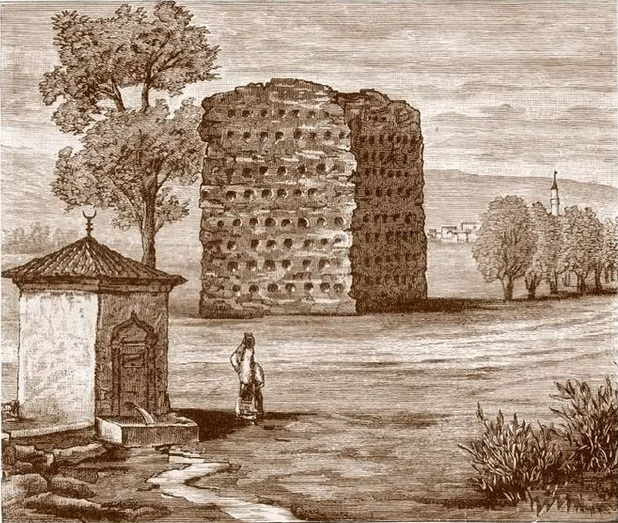
The Skull Tower shown in an 1863 sketch

The fall of Sinđelić's trench forced the other Serbian units to retreat back to the town of Deligrad, where they entrenched themselves in a new, fortified front line. When Hurshid Pasha realized this, even though the post at Čegar hill had been taken, he ordered that the heads of the Serb victims be collected, skinned, and that the skulls be built into the "Skull Tower". This tower was built along the road to Constantinople, as a warning to anyone revolting against the Ottoman Empire. The Serbian defeat meant the loss of initiative in the war, which lasted until 1813. Thousands of Serbian revolutionaries and Ottoman troops were killed on Čegar Hill. In 1815 the Second Serbian Uprising began under the leadership of Miloš Obrenović.

== Gallery ==
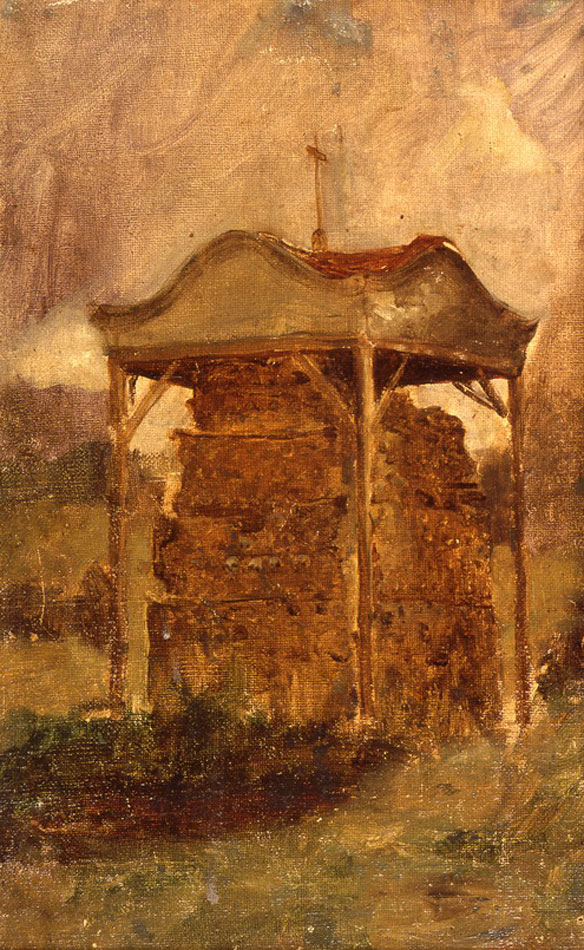
Ćele kula (1883) by Đorđe Krstić

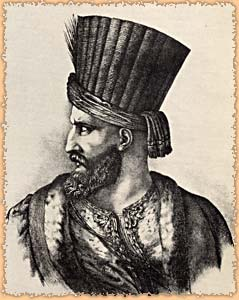
Hursid Pasha

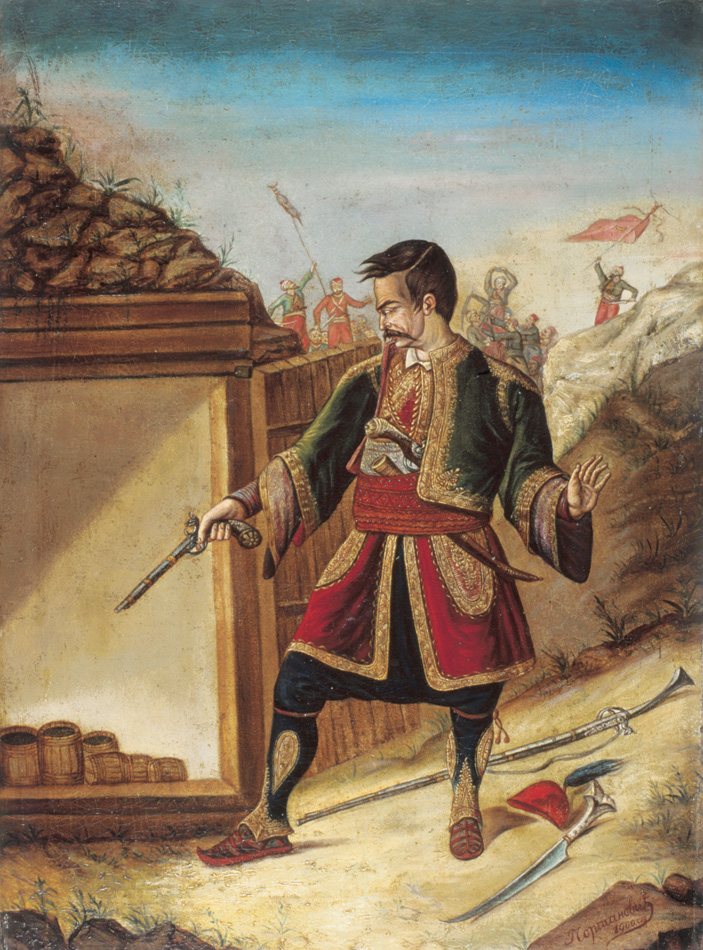
Stevan Sinđelić

== Sources ==
- Perović, Radoslav (1954). Grada za istoriju Prvog srpskog ustanka. p. 269.
- Kessler, James (2016). Echoes of Empire: An Accidental Historian's Journey Through the Post-Ottoman World. ISBN 978-1-4834-4482-6.
- Protić, A. (1892). A history from the time of the Serbian leader Karađorđe. Spomenik (in Serbian).
- Никола Чупић (1904). Годишњица Николе Чупића. Vol. 23. Штампа Државне штампарије Краљевине Југославије. p. 170.
- Stojančević, Vladimir (1994). Prvi srpski ustanak: Ogledi i studije. Vojna knj. pp. 90–98.
