= Serbs in Turkey =

Ethnic group in the Republic of Turkey

Türkiye'deki Sırplar Срби у Турској Srbi u Turskoj

Total population
- 1,622 (2023)

Languages
- Serbian and Turkish

Religion
- Eastern Orthodoxy, minority Sunni Islam

Serbs in Turkey are Turkish citizens of ethnic Serb descent or Serbian citizens living in Turkey. According to data from 2023, there were 1,622 Serbian citizens living in Turkey.

== History ==
During the age of the Ottoman Empire most of Serbia and the Balkans were under Turkish control, and many Serbs moved to Istanbul and Anatolia for reasons ranging from economic to forceful relocation. On 28 August 1521, the Belgrade Fortress was captured by Suleiman the Magnificent, using 250,000 Turkish soldiers and over 100 ships. Subsequently, most of the city was razed to the ground and its entire Orthodox Christian population was deported to Istanbul to an area that has since become known as the Belgrade forest. Many Janissaries were of Serbian descent and were taken as children from their homes and educated in Turkey. Some Serbs achieved political prominence and several Grand Viziers were born as Serbs.

== Notable people ==
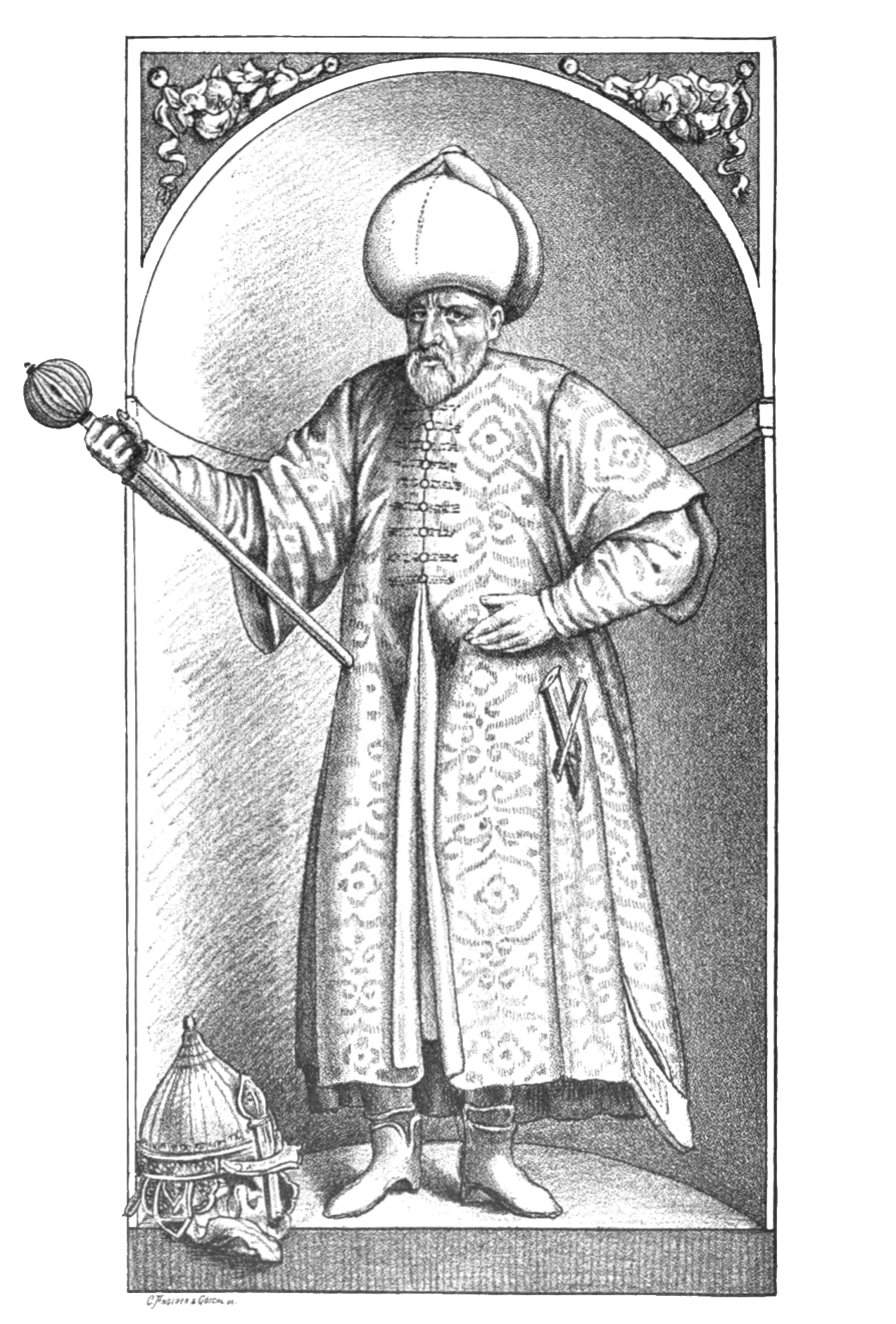
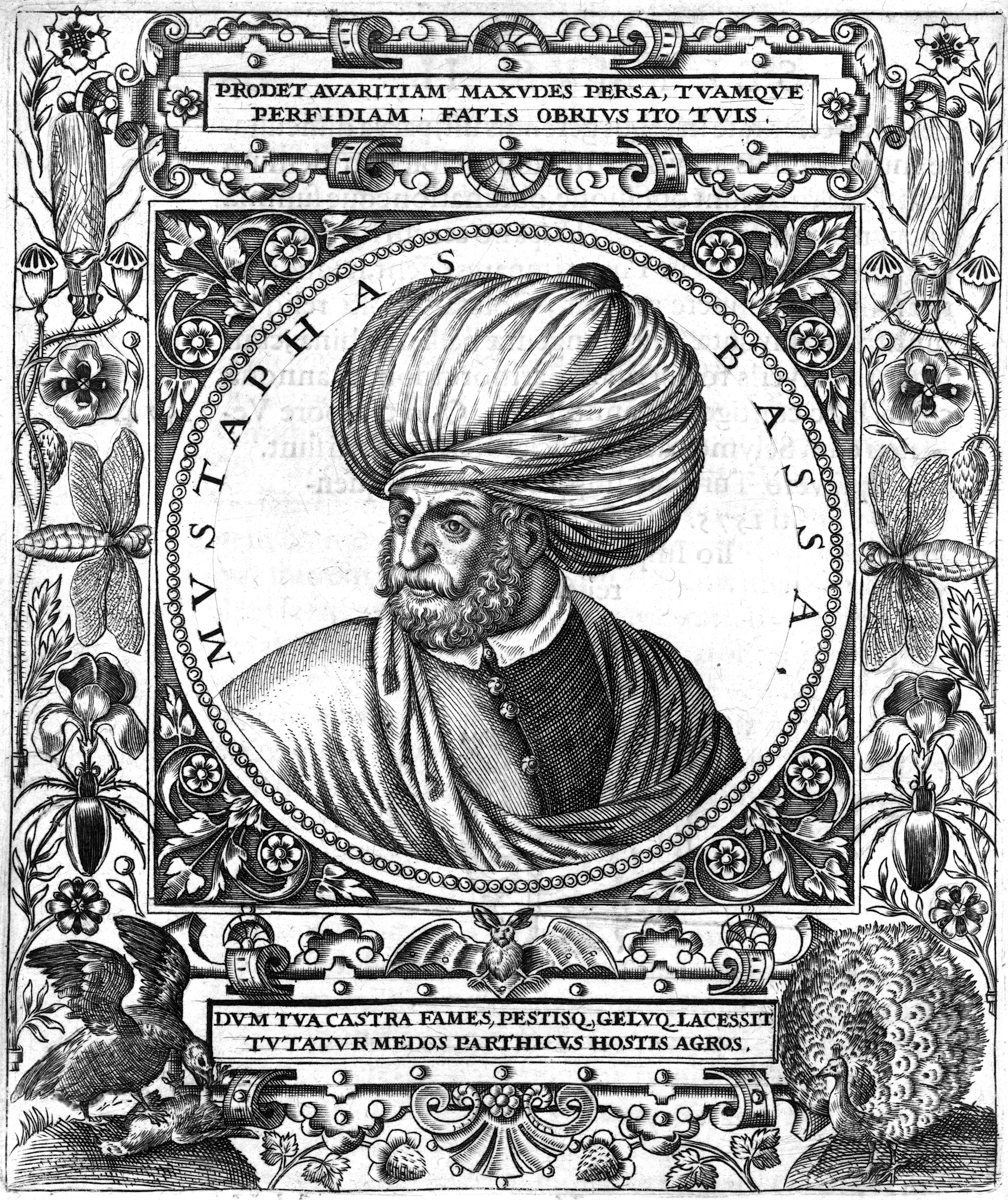
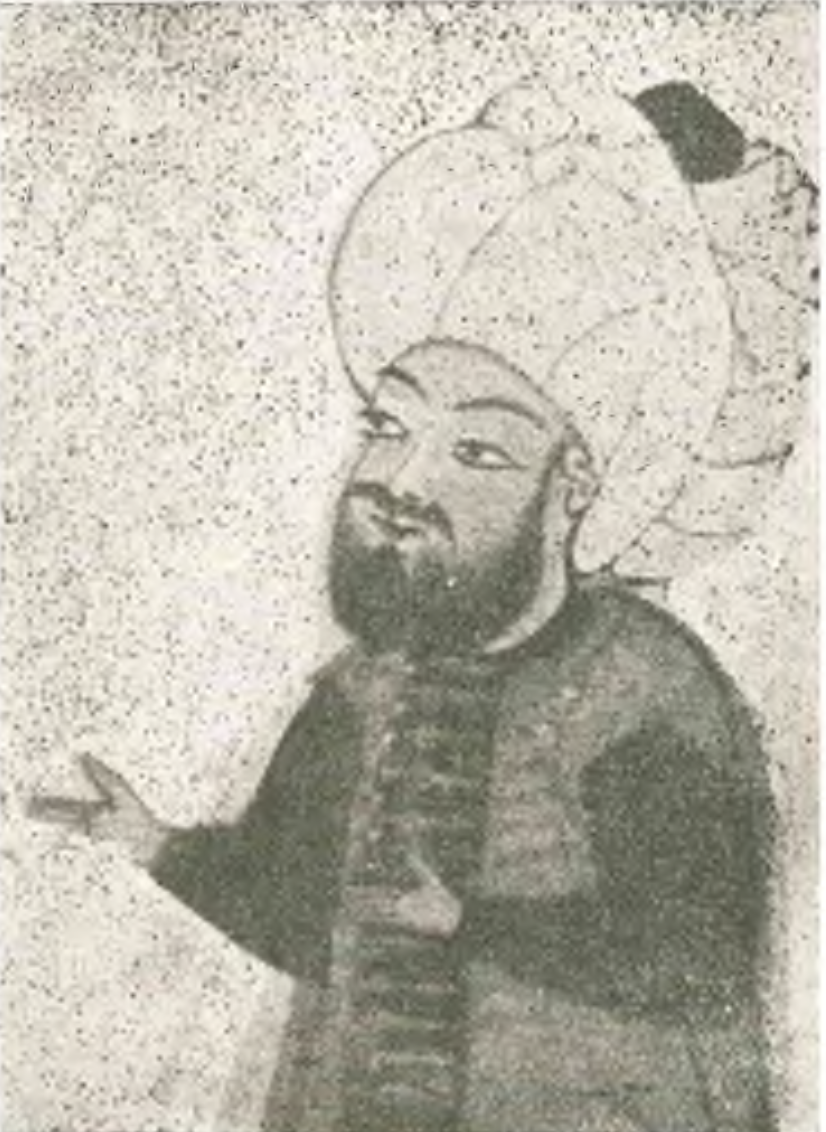
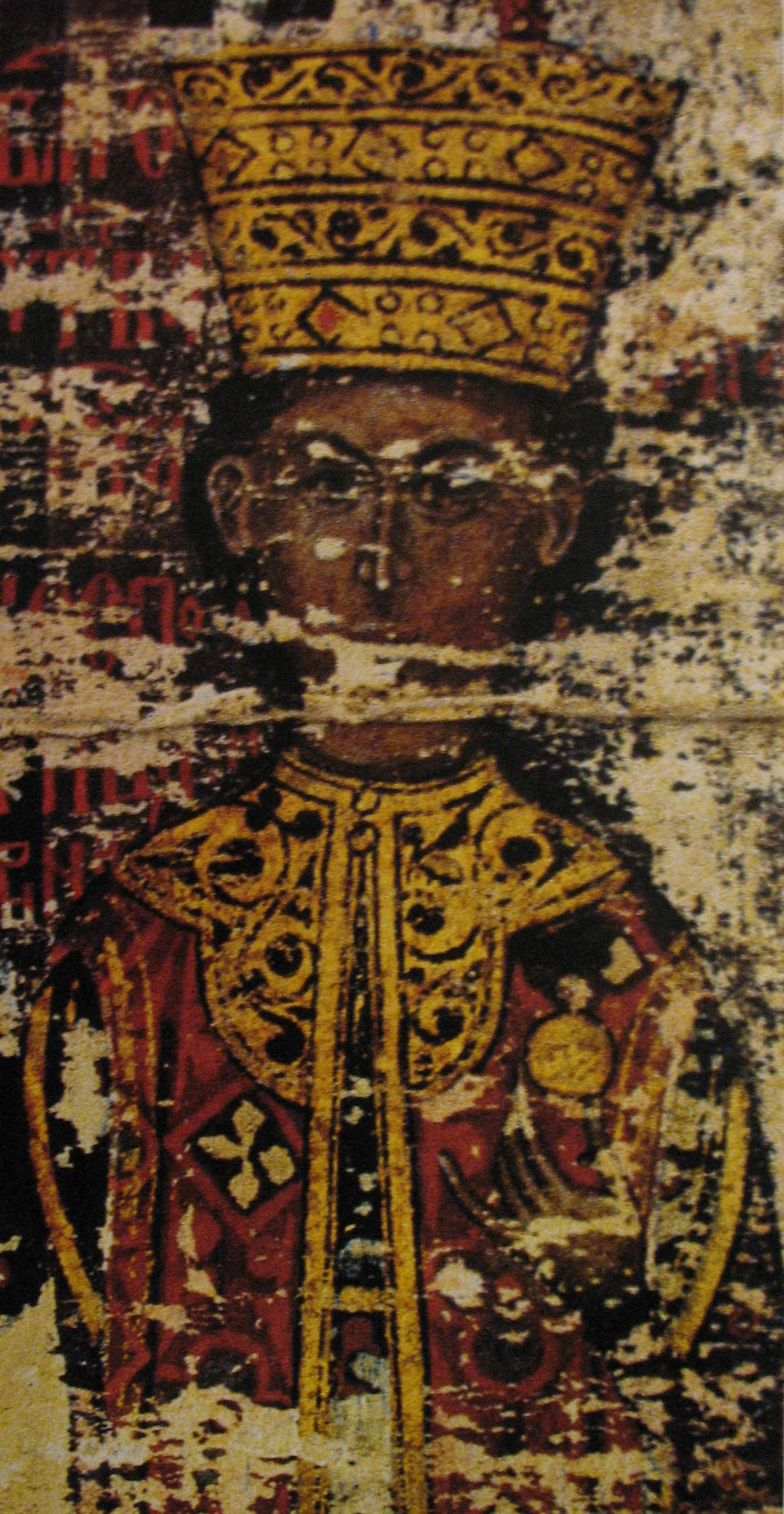
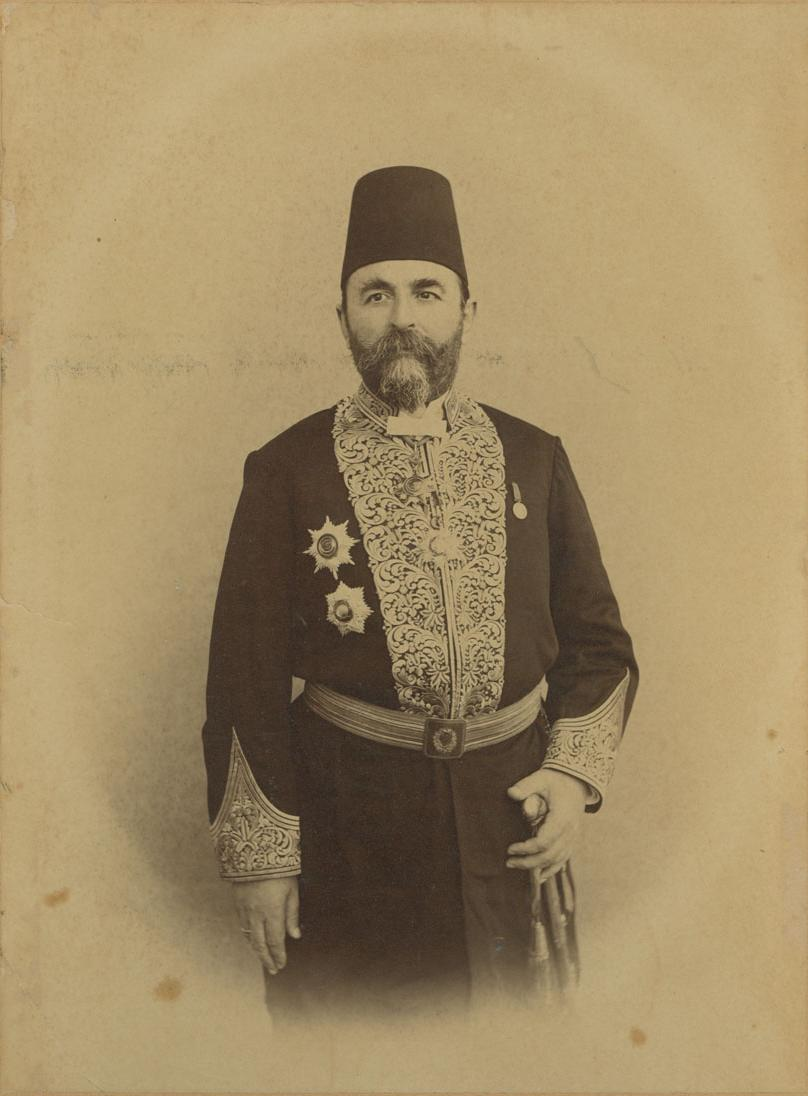
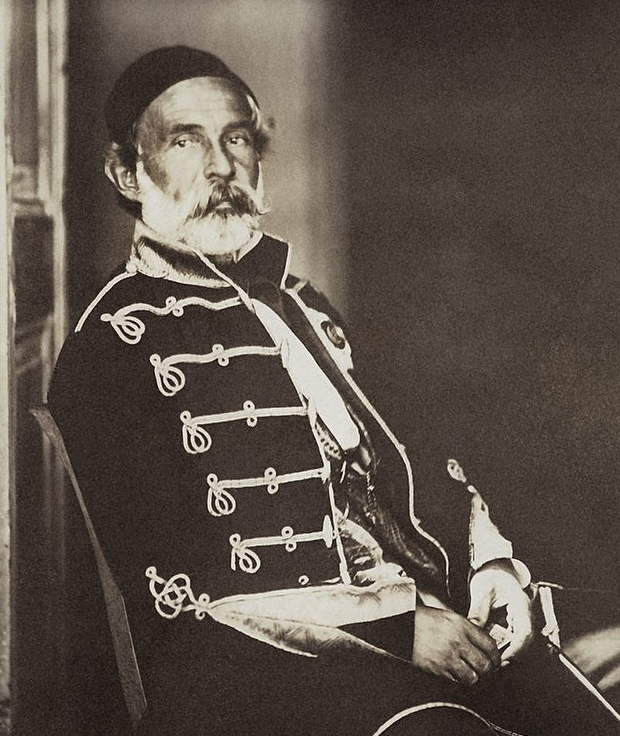
Sokollu Mehmed Pasha	Lala Mustafa Pasha	Mahmud Pasha Angelović	Mara Branković	George Berovich	Omar Pasha

- Mahmud Pasha Angelović – Ottoman Grand Vizier from 1456 to 1466 and from 1472 to 1474
- Gedik Ahmed Pasha – Ottoman Grand Vizier from 1474 to 1477
- Deli Husrev Pasha – Ottoman second vizier
- Hadım Ali Pasha – Ottoman Grand Vizier from 1501 to 1503 and 1506 to 1511
- Lala Mustafa Pasha – Ottoman Grand Vizier in 1580
- Semiz Ali Pasha – Ottoman Grand Vizier from 1561 to 1565
- Sokollu Mehmed Pasha – Ottoman Grand Vizier from 1565 to 1579
- Sokolluzade Lala Mehmed Pasha – Ottoman Grand Vizier from 1604 to 1606
- Boşnak Derviş Mehmed Pasha – Ottoman Grand Vizier during 1606
- Nevesinli Salih Pasha – Ottoman Grand Vizier from 1645 to 1647
- Kara Musa Pasha – Ottoman Grand Vizier during 1647
- Sarı Süleyman Pasha – Ottoman Grand Vizier from 1685 to 1687
- Daltaban Mustafa Pasha – Ottoman Grand Vizier from 1702 to 1703
- Damat Melek Mehmed Pasha – Ottoman Grand Vizier from 1792 to 1794
- Ivaz Mehmed Pasha – Ottoman Grand Vizier from 1739 to 1740
- Yavuz Ali Pasha – Ottoman Governor of Egypt from 1601 to 1603
- Meylişah Hatun – Consort to Sultan Osman II
- George Berovich – Governor-General of Crete and Prince of Samos
- Omar Pasha – Ottoman military figure
- Mara Branković – wife of Murad II
- Osman Ağa of Temeşvar – Ottoman military figure
- Sinan-paša Sijerčić – Ottoman military figure
- Celal Şengör – geologist, distant paternal Serb descent
- Nevzat Tandoğan – mayor and governor of Ankara, maternal Serbian descent
- Ivana Sert – media personality

== See also ==
- Immigration to Turkey
- Gallipoli Serbs
- Serb diaspora
- Serbia–Turkey relations
