= Kamenica, Niš =

Kamenica Каменица
- Village
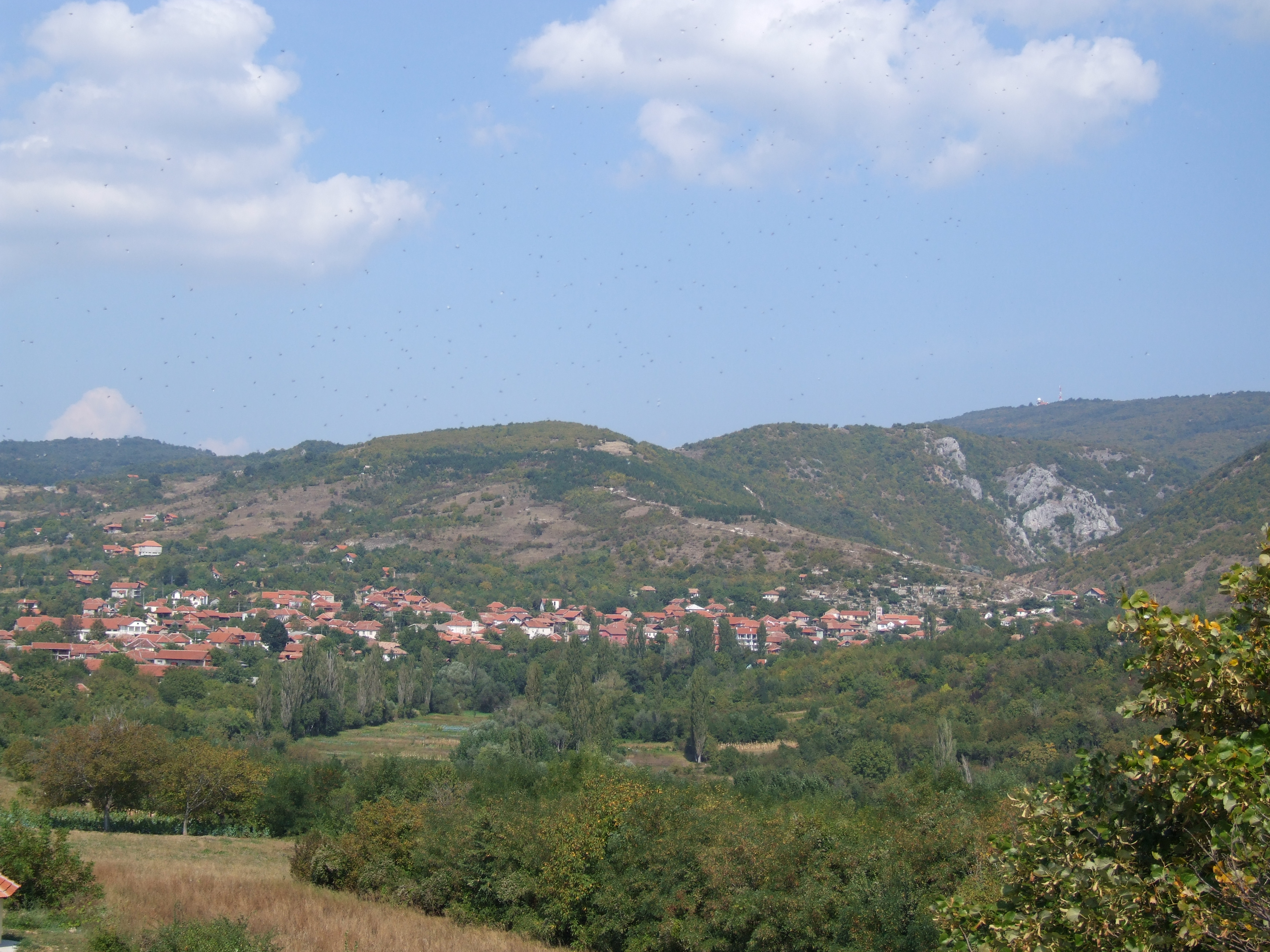
- View of Kamenica near Niš

- Location within Serbia
- Country: Serbia
- Region: Southern and Eastern Serbia
- District: Nišava
- City: Niš
- Municipality: Pantelej

Population (2022)
  - Total: 3,773
- Time zone: UTC+1 (CET)
  - Summer (DST): UTC+2 (CEST)

Kamenica is a village in the municipality of Pantelej, in the city of Niš, Nišava District, Serbia. It lies 8 kilometres (5.0 mi) north of central Niš, at the foot of Kamenički Vis on the edge of the Niš Basin.

== History ==
Roman remains, including an aqueduct towards Niš, indicate ancient settlement. The village predates Ottoman rule and suffered damage during the war of 1877.

Roman coin hoards were discovered on nearby Vinik hill in 1936. Oxford's Coin Hoards of the Roman Empire database estimates between 100,000 and 380,000 coins, noting uncertainty over whether the finds represented one or two hoards.

The Battle of Čegar took place in the village's territory on 31 May 1809, during the First Serbian Uprising.

== Economy ==
During the 20th century, agriculture became increasingly market-oriented. After the Second World War, migration and commuting to Niš accompanied a decline in agricultural employment.

== Cultural heritage ==
The Čegar memorial commemorates Stevan Sinđelić and the fallen insurgents. The original monument dates from 1878; the present tower was unveiled in 1927.

The nearby Monastery of Saint George is recorded in Ottoman registers from 1498. The village's Church of Saint Nicholas was built in 1831.

== Transport ==
The city's designated suburban bus routes 14 and 14A link Kamenica with Niš, Brenica and Cerje.

== Demographics ==
The 2022 census recorded 3,773 residents.

Census population
Year	Population
1948	4,466
1953	4,533
1961	5,566
1971	7,432
1981	8,881
1991	3,966
2002	3,914
2011	3,745
2022	3,773

The figures use the territorial boundaries of the 2022 census; census methodologies differ between years.

== Gallery ==
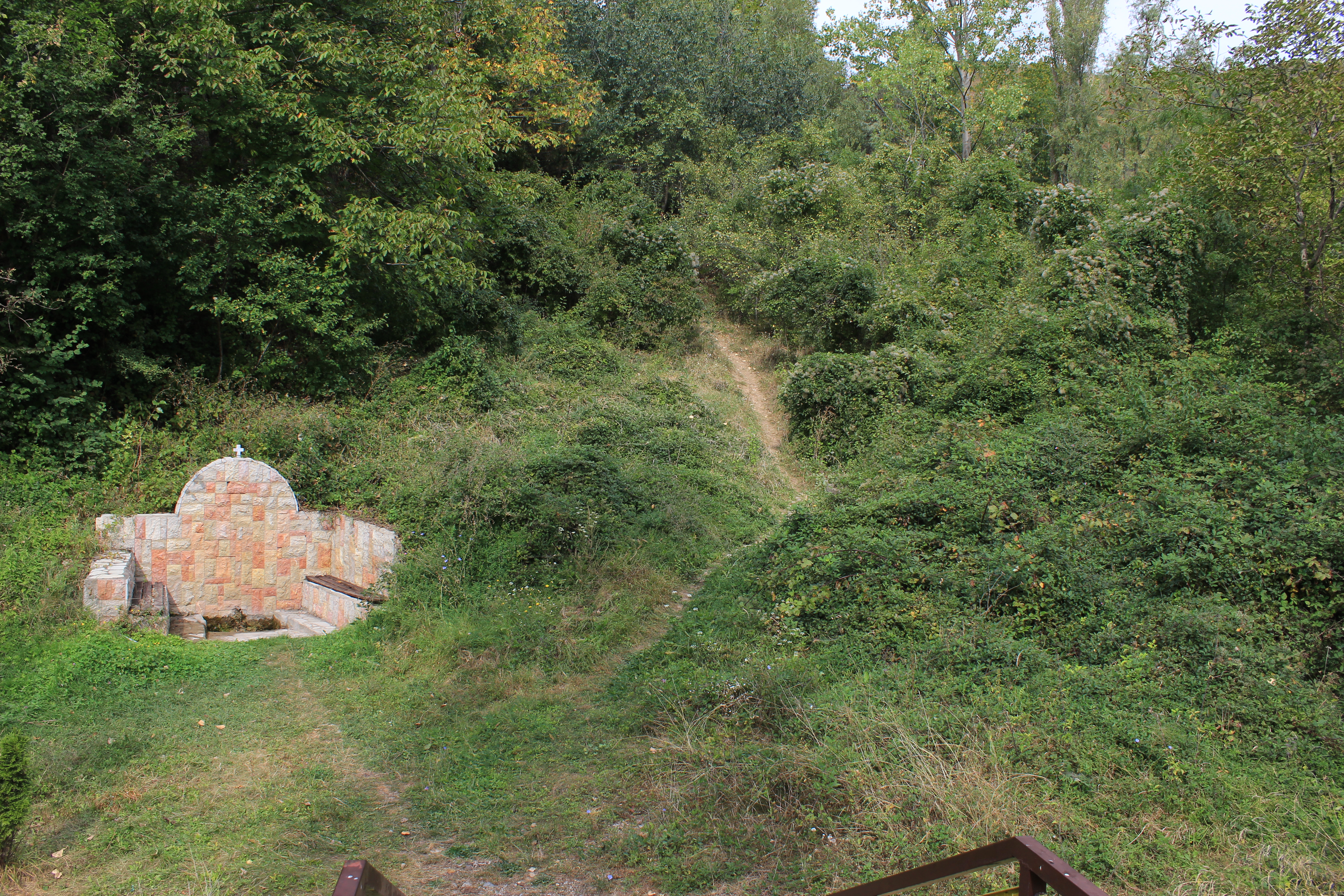

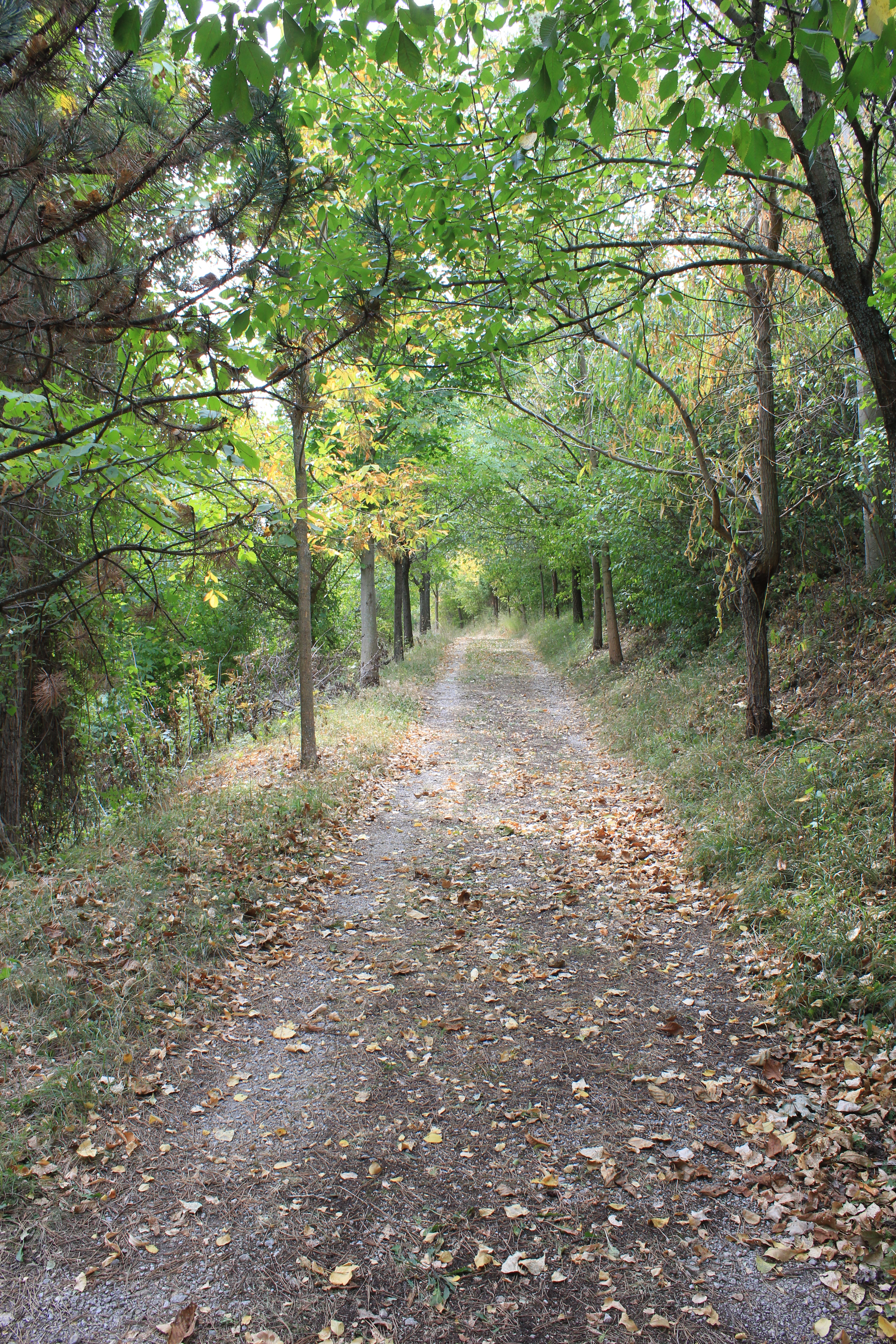

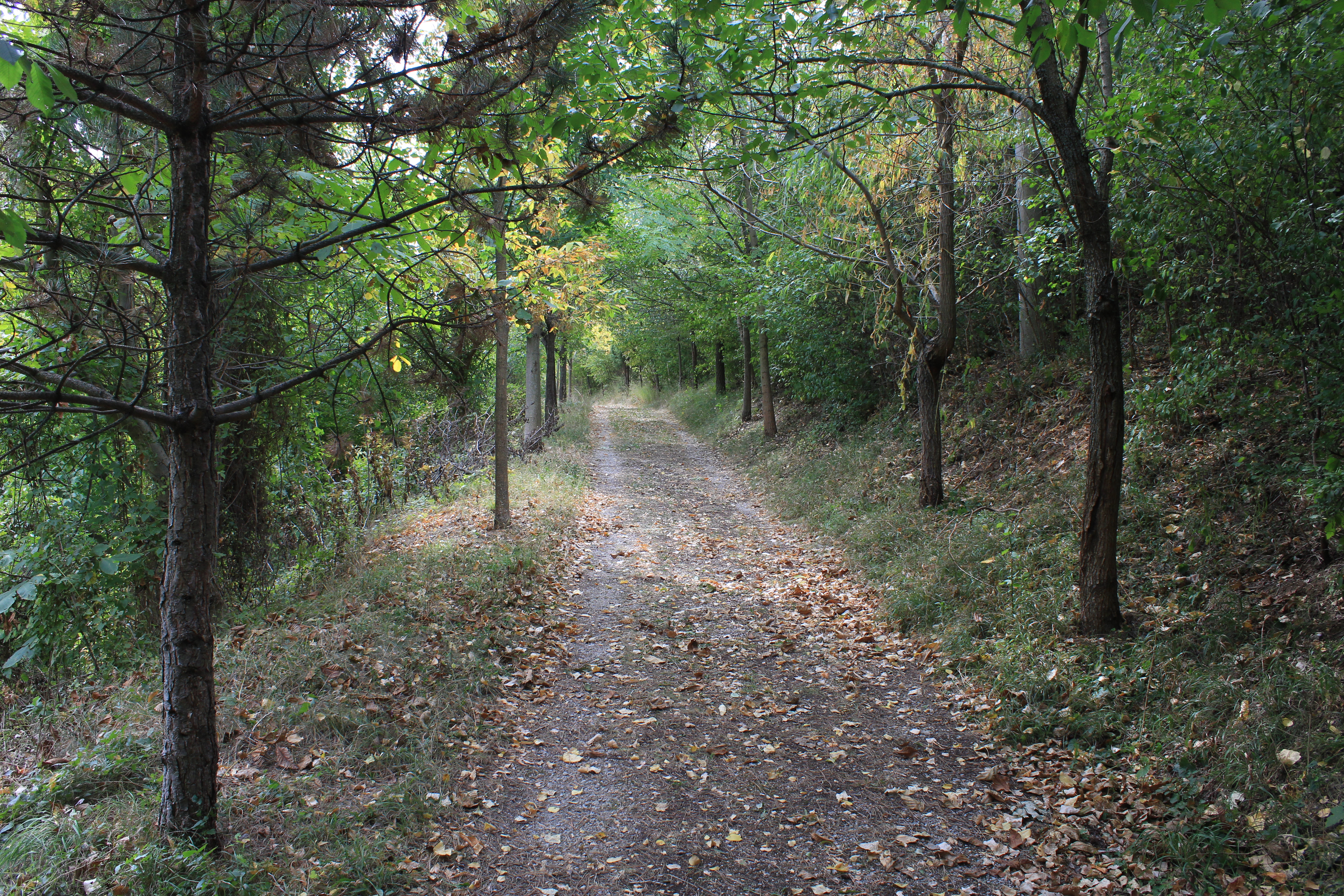

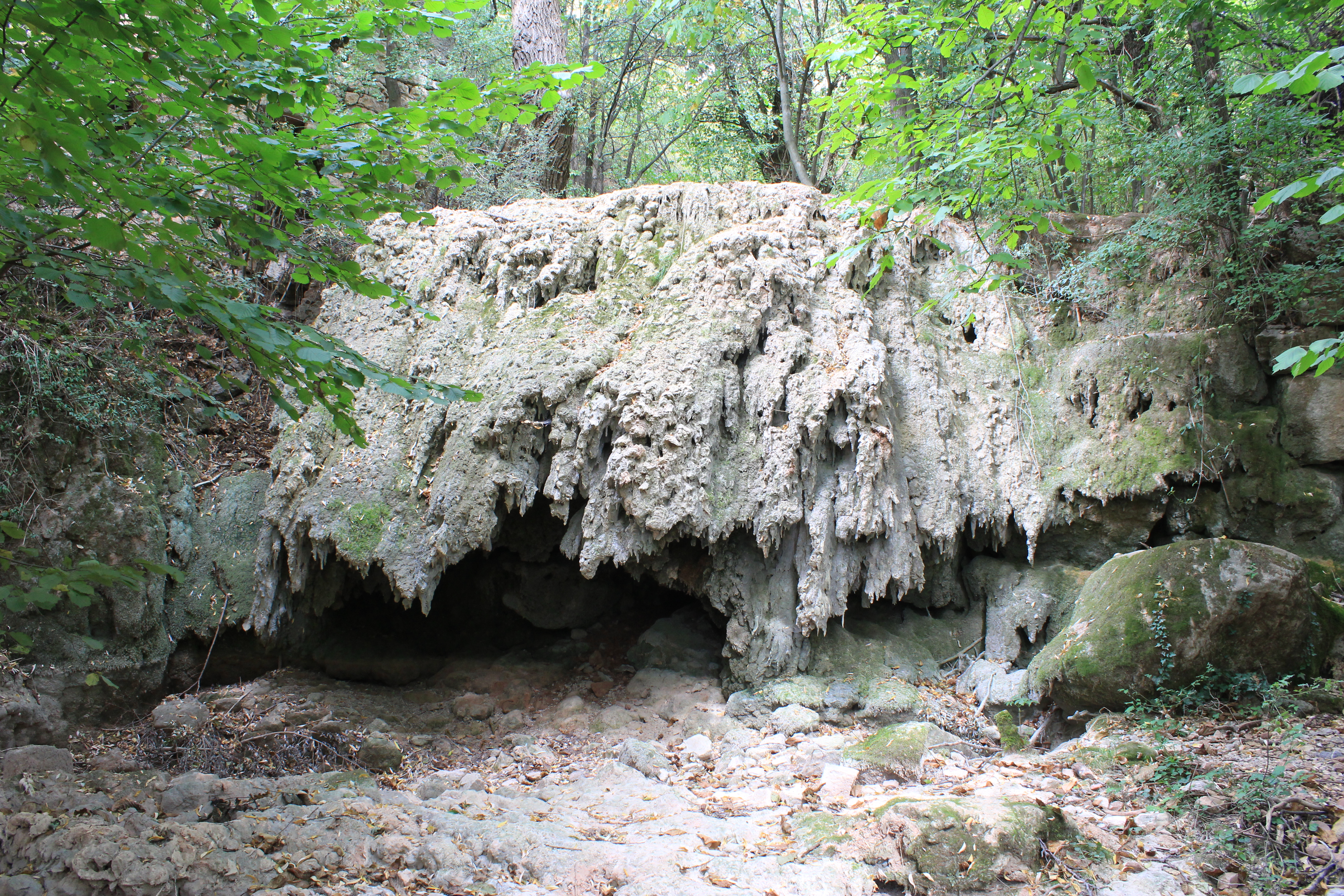

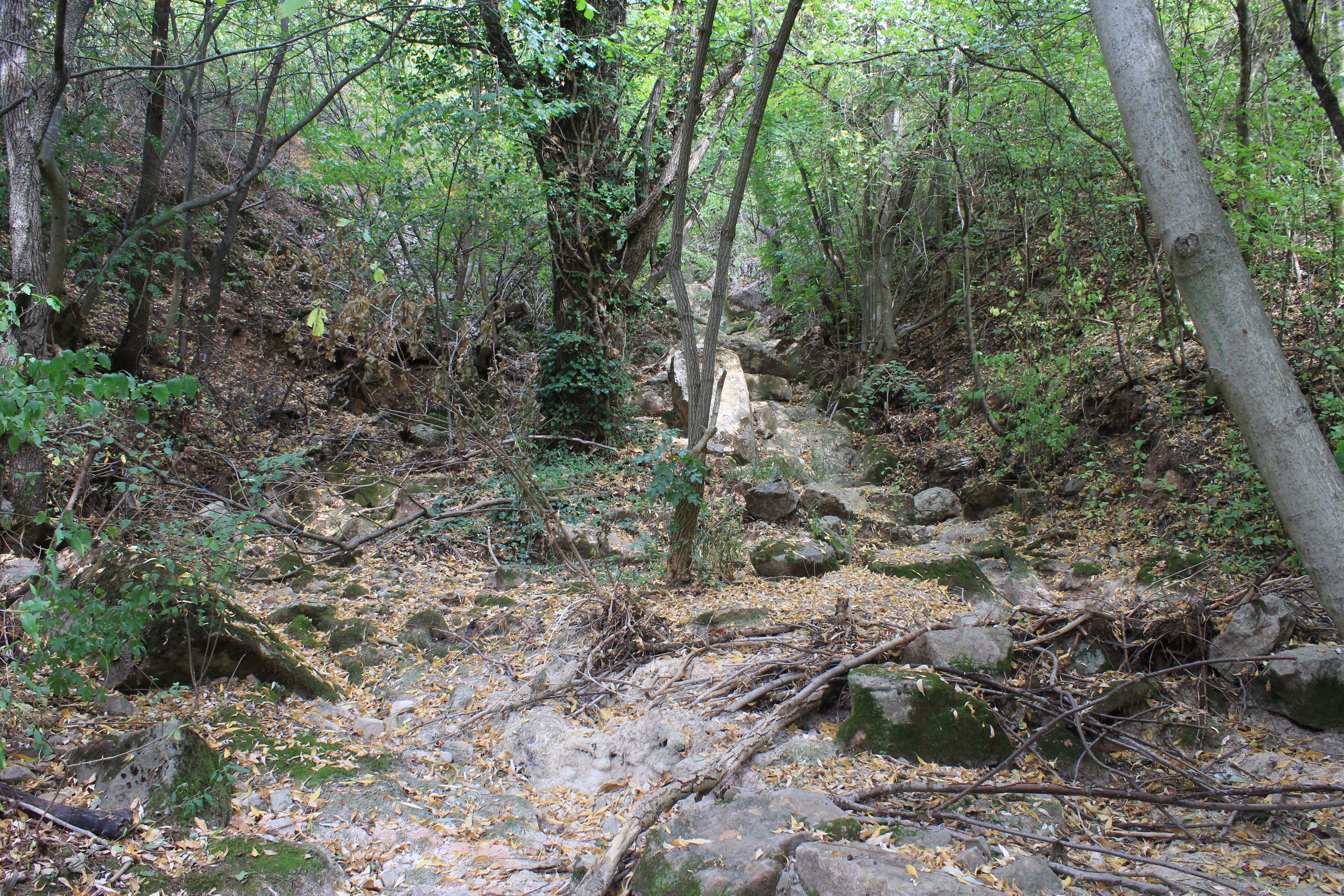

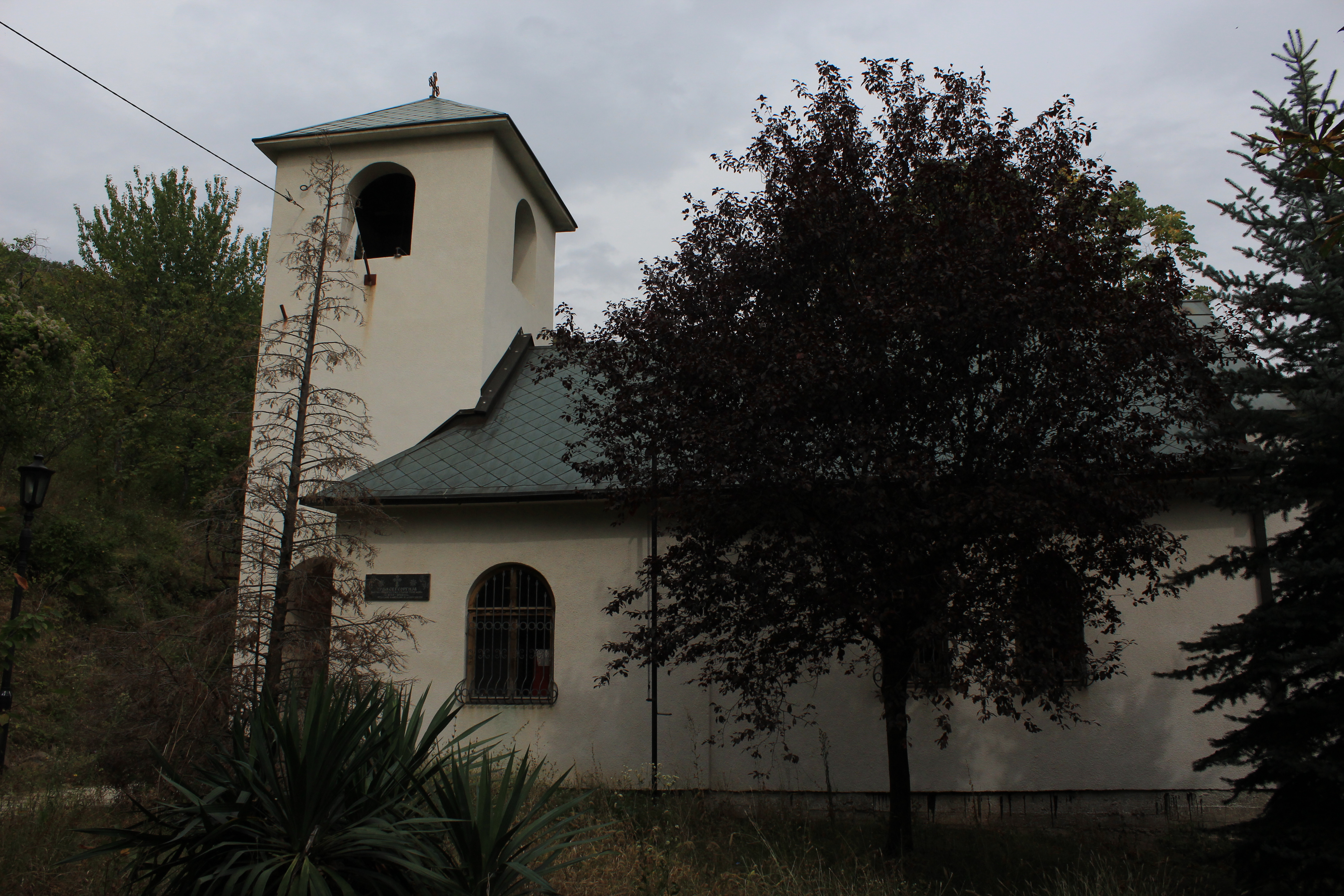

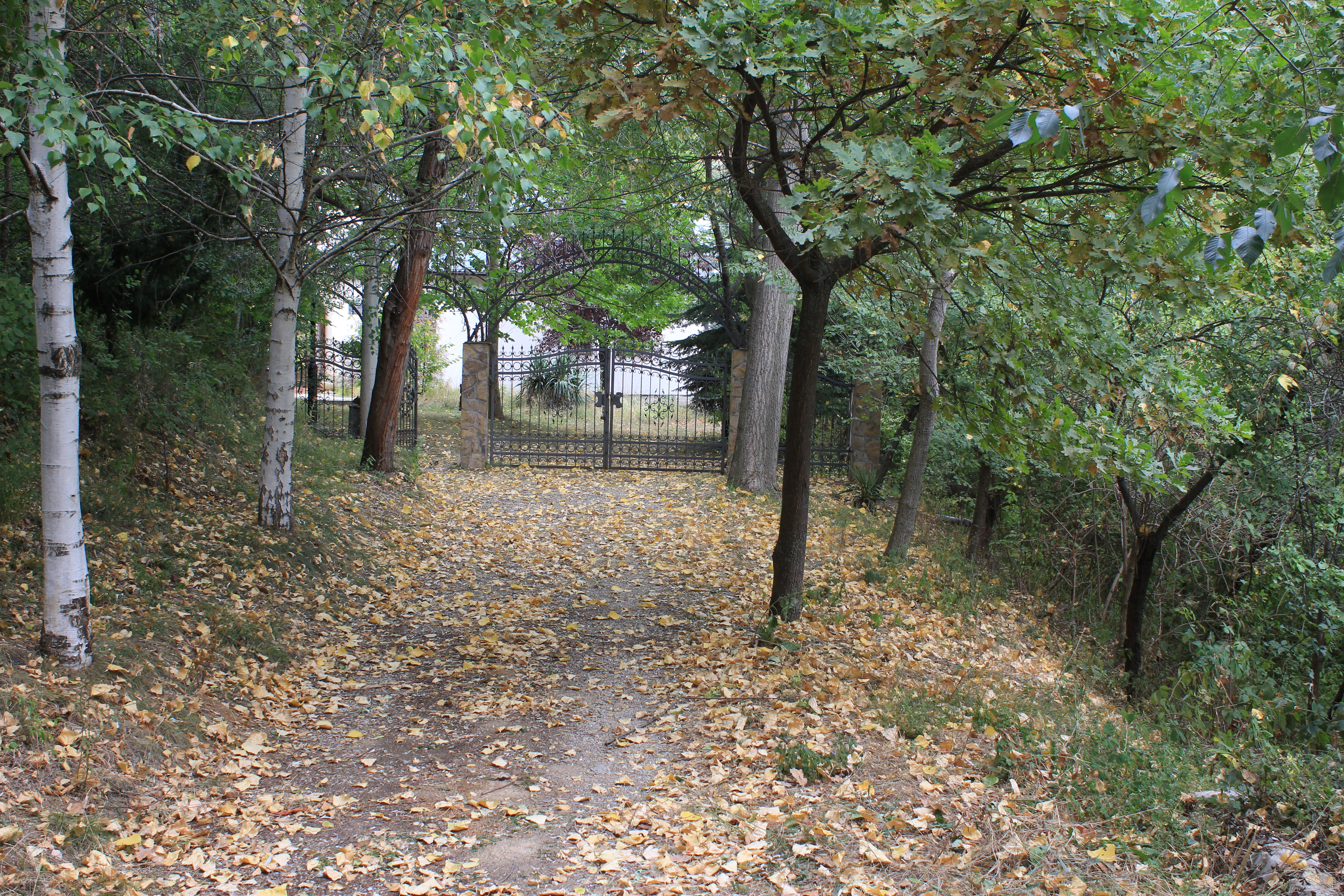

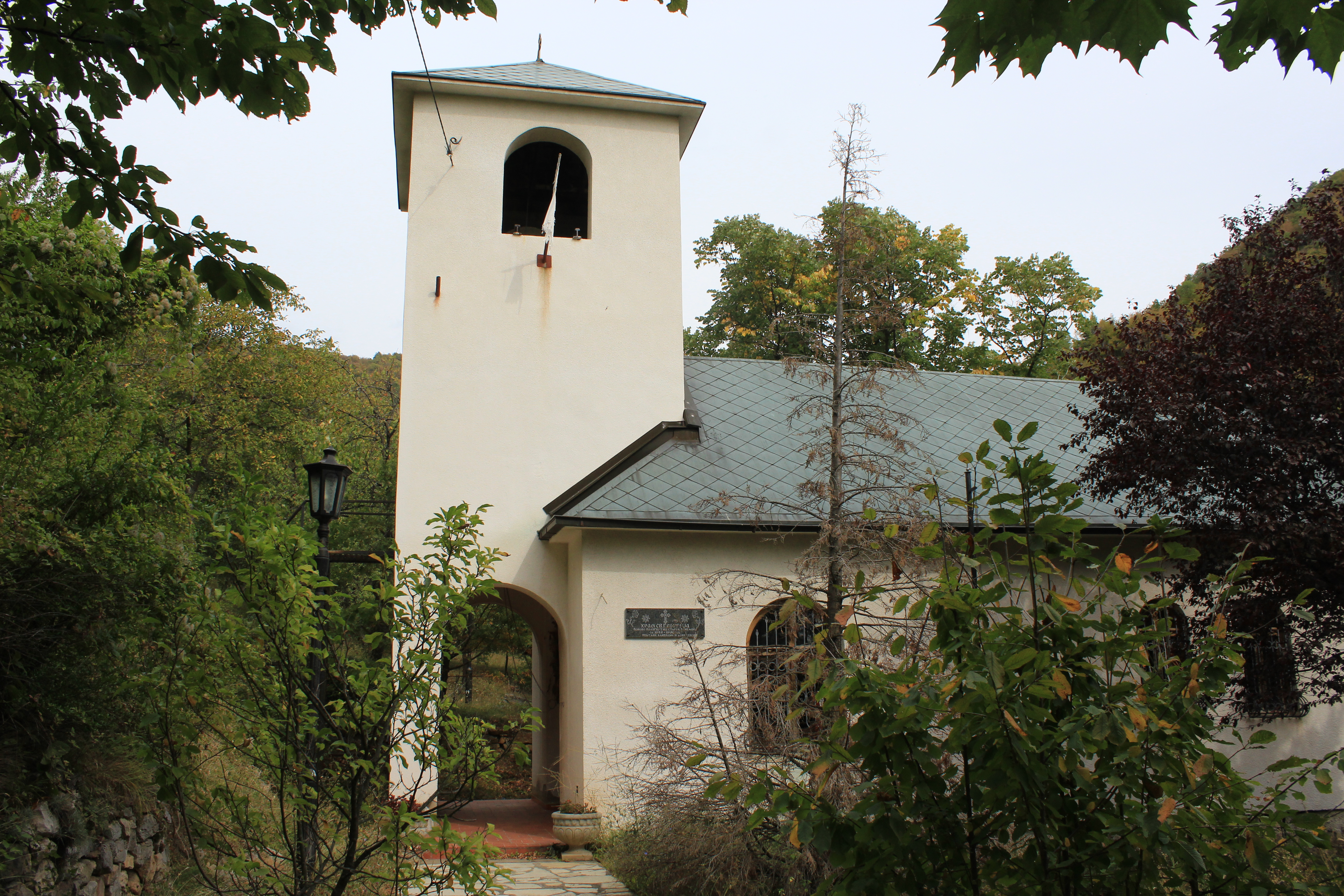

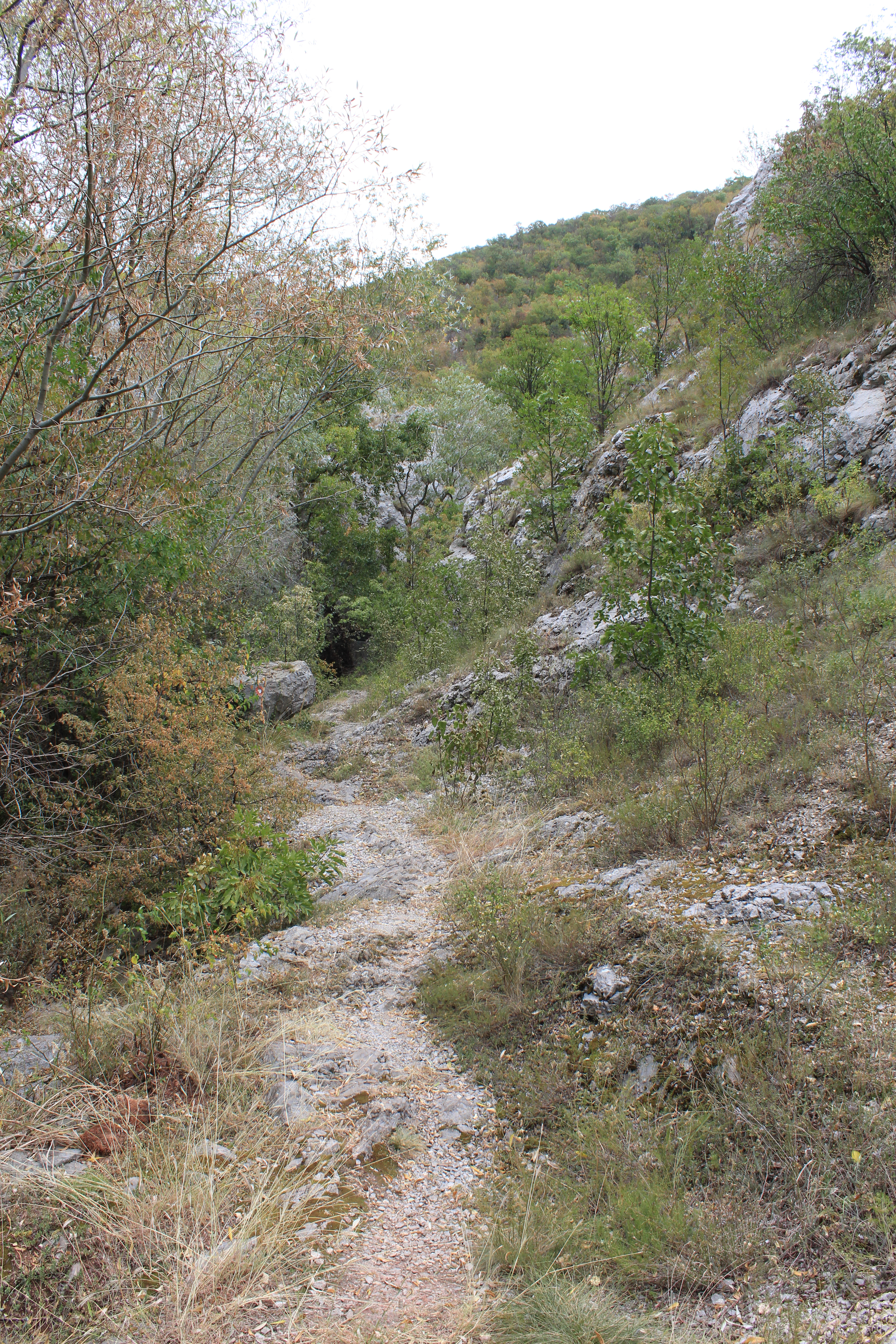

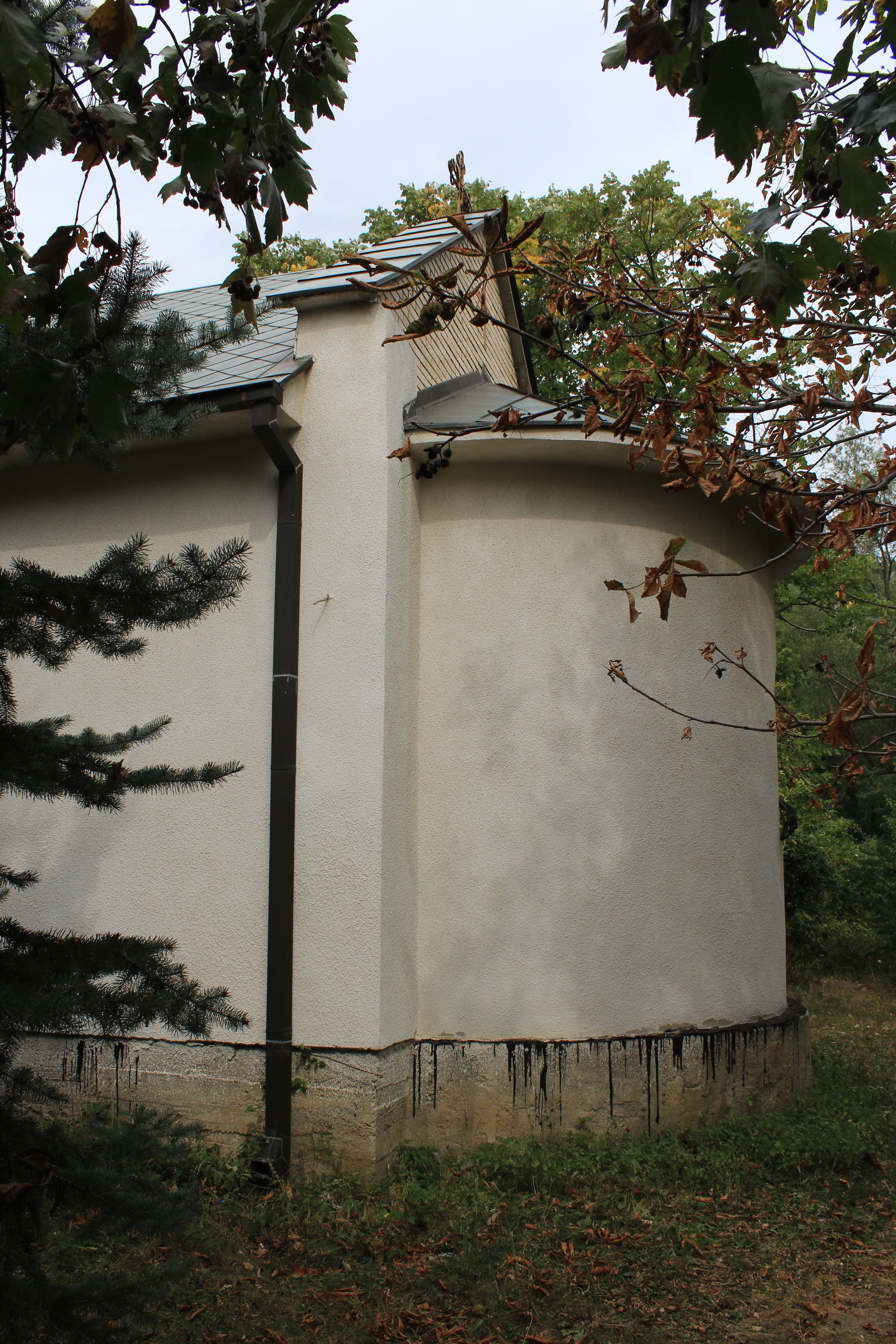

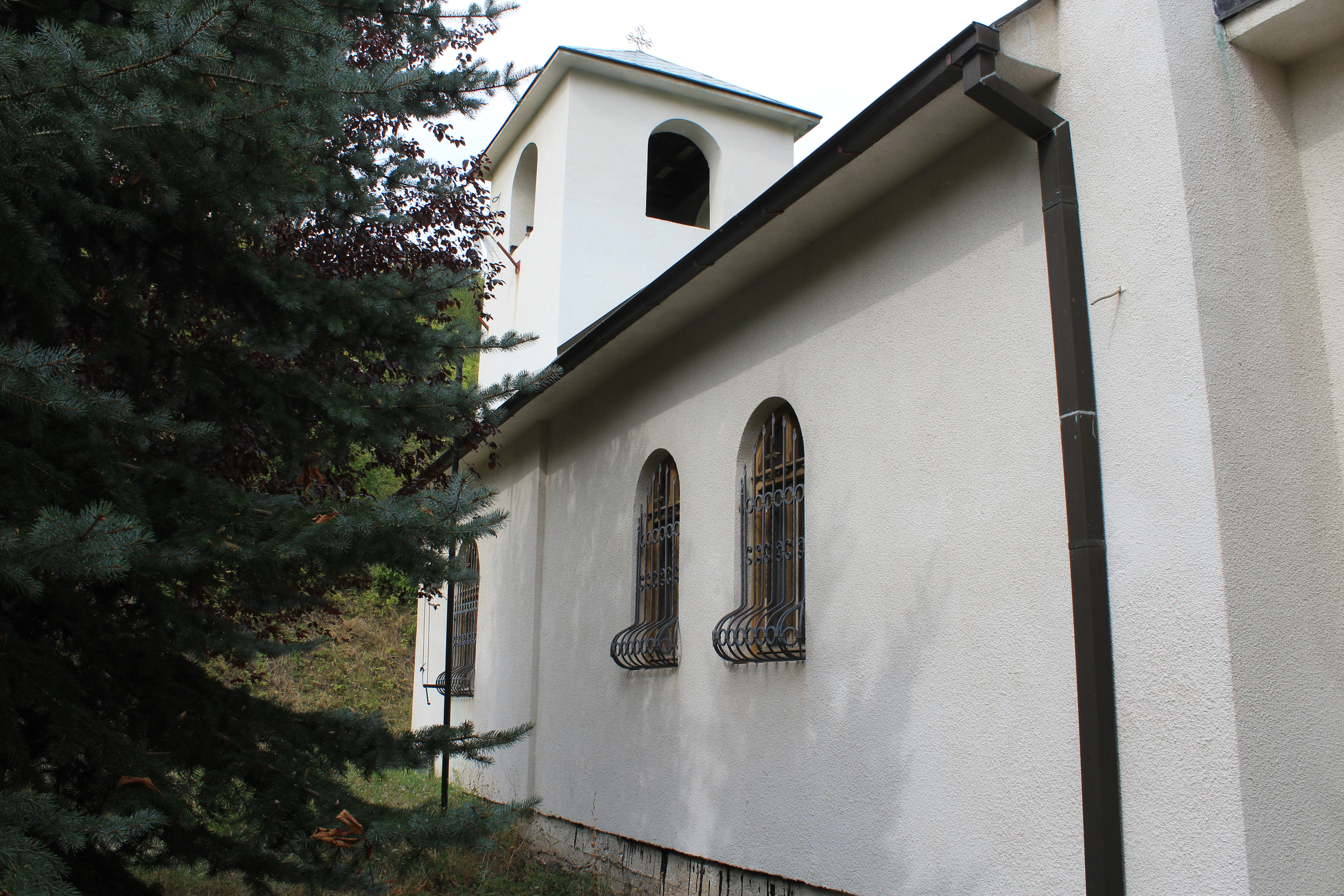

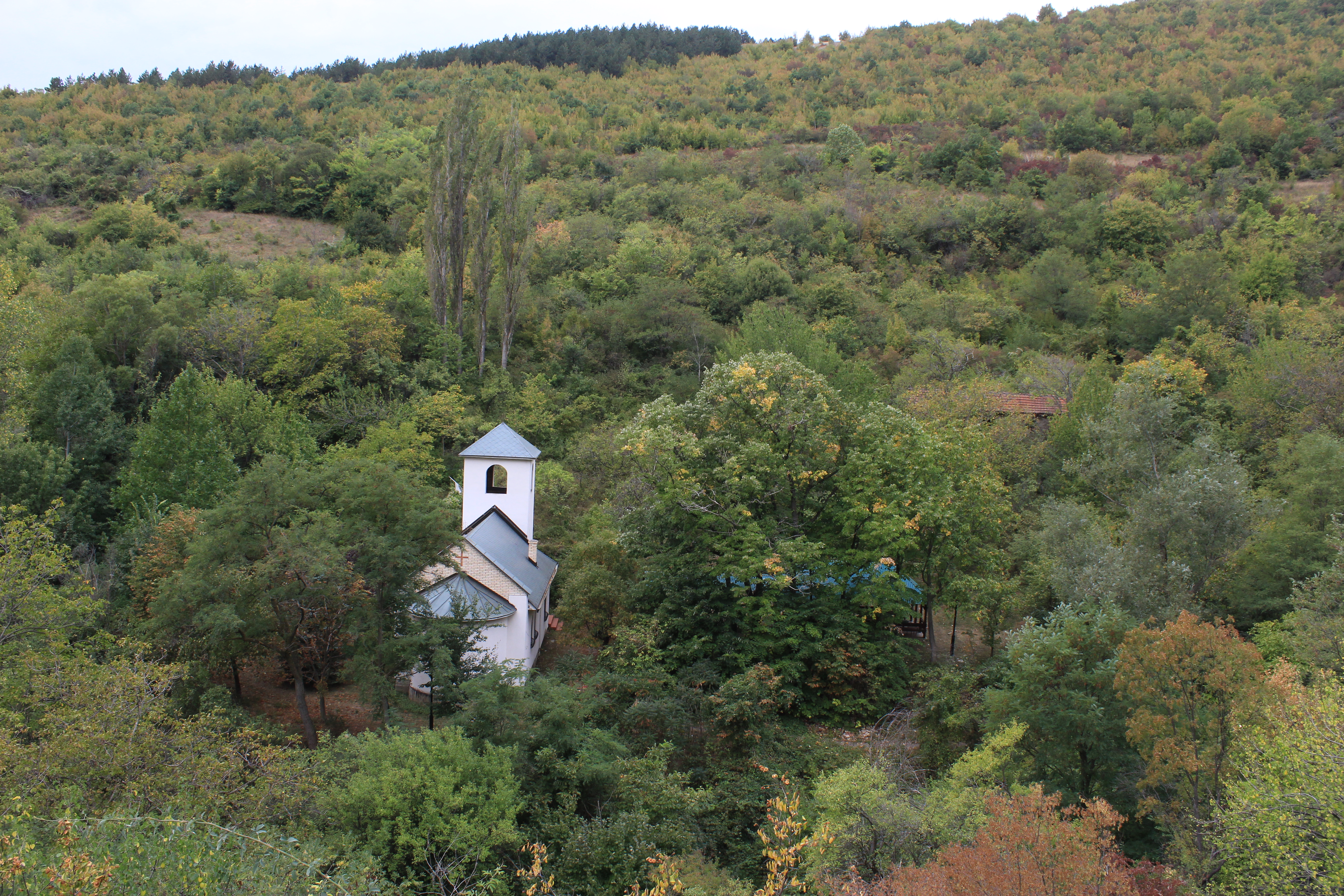

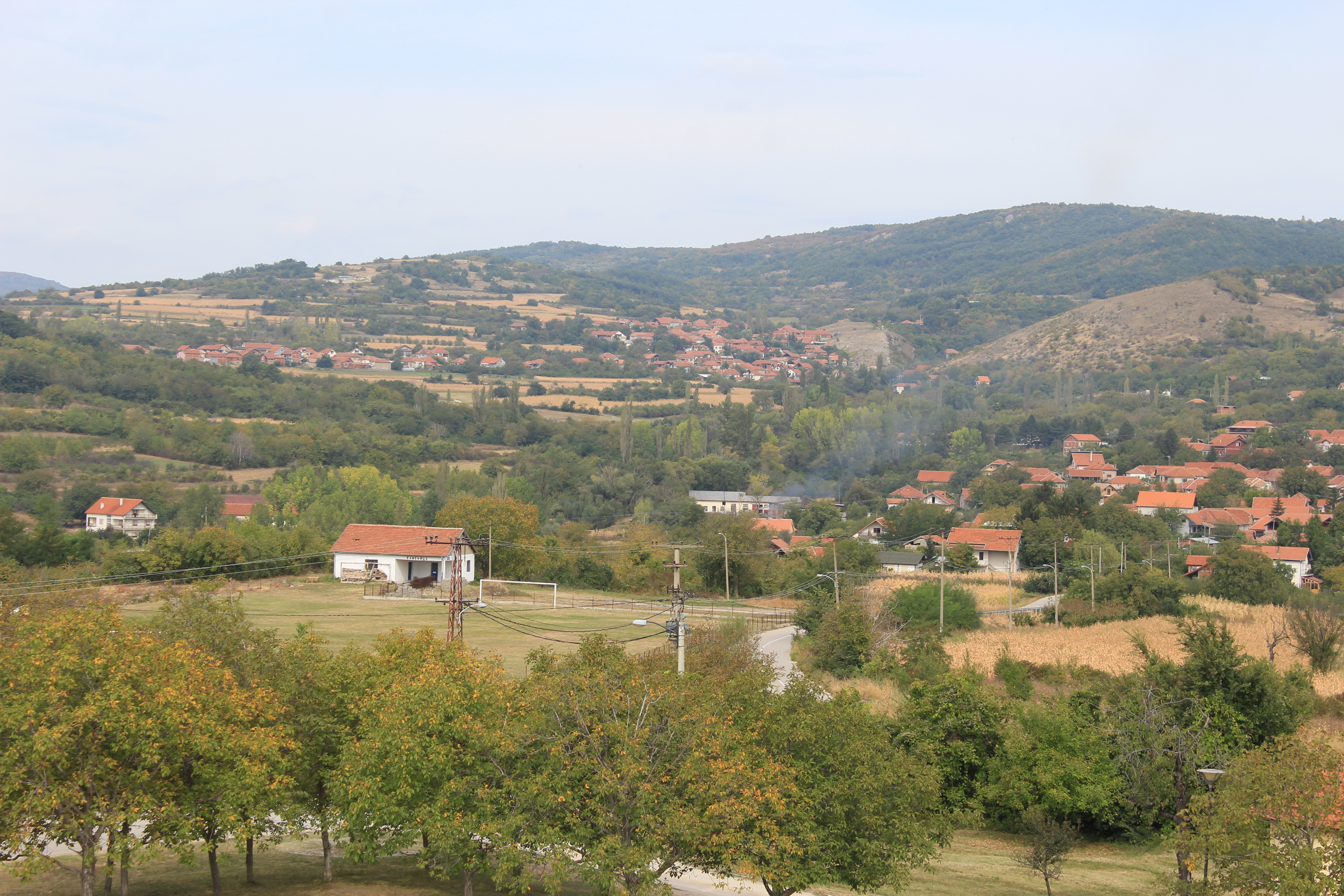

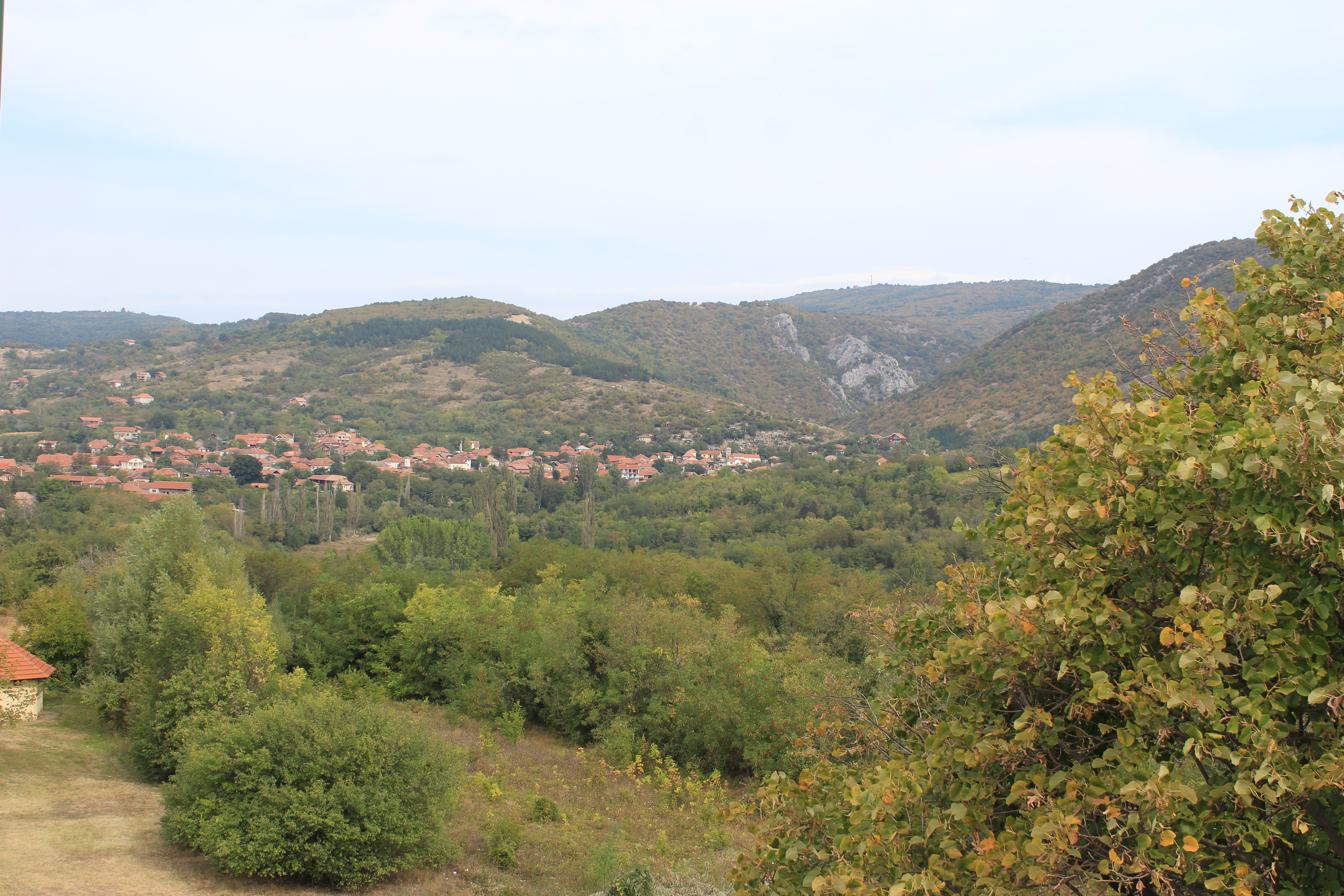
