= Vujičići, Brčko =

Vujičići Вујичићи
- Village
- Location within Bosnia and Herzegovina
- Coordinates: 44°47′46″N 18°38′31″E
- Country: Bosnia and Herzegovina
- Entity: Brčko District

Area
  - Total: 2.87 sq mi (7.44 km^{2})

Population (2013)
  - Total: 45
  - Density: 16/sq mi (6.0/km^{2})
- Time zone: UTC+1 (CET)
  - Summer (DST): UTC+2 (CEST)

Vujičići (Serbian Cyrillic: Вујичићи) is a village in the municipality of Brčko, Bosnia and Herzegovina.

The name of the village is the plural form of the surname Vujičić.

== Demographics ==
According to the 2013 census, its population was 45.

Ethnicity in 2013
Ethnicity	Number	Percentage
Serbs	44	97.8%
Croats	1	2.2%
Total	45	100%
