= Jagodin Mala =

Jagodin Mala Jaгoдин Maлa
- Neighborhood
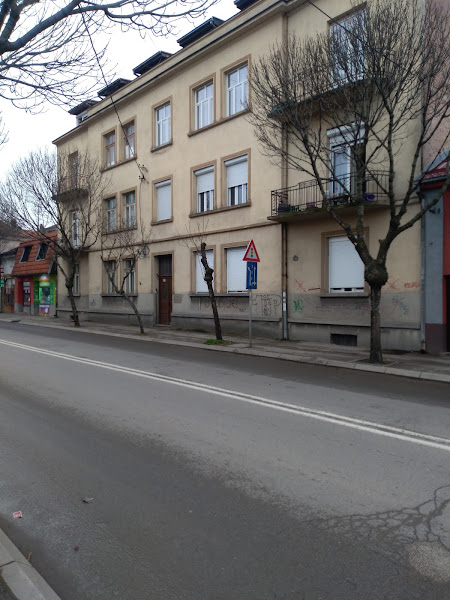

- Location within Serbia
- Country: Serbia
- Region: Southern and Eastern Serbia
- District: Nišava
- City: Niš
- Municipality: Pantelej; Crveni Krst
- Time zone: UTC+1 (CET)
  - Summer (DST): UTC+2 (CEST)

Jagodin Mala (english: Strawberry Mahallah) (Serbian Cyrillic: Jaгoдин Maлa) is a neighborhood of the city of Niš, Serbia. It is located in Niš municipalities of Crveni Krst and Pantelej.

== Location ==
Jagodin Mala is located in the central part of Niš. It is flat and bordered on the south by the Nišava river, on the east by neighborhood of Durlan, and on the north-east by the neighborhood of Pantelej.

== Characteristics ==
Jagodin Mala is one of the oldest neighborhoods of Niš, dating back to Roman ages. The neighbourhood lies on top of an important archaeological site. Ruins of several early Christian sacral objects have been uncovered, most famous one is Early Byzantine Tomb with Frescoes, Monuments of Culture of Exceptional Importance.

In the beginning of 18th century Abdurahman efendija of Niš settled Gallipoli Serbs from Jagodina in his čiflik on the right side of the Nišava not far from the Niš fortress. From these čifliks, Jagodin Mala received its name.

The neighborhood is mostly residential, with individual family houses and small shops making up most of it. A notable exception is Nitex, a textile industrial area.
