= Pantelej =

Coordinates: 43°20′13″N 21°54′47″E

Pantelej Пантелеј
- City municipality
- City municipality of Pantelej; Градска општина Пантелеј
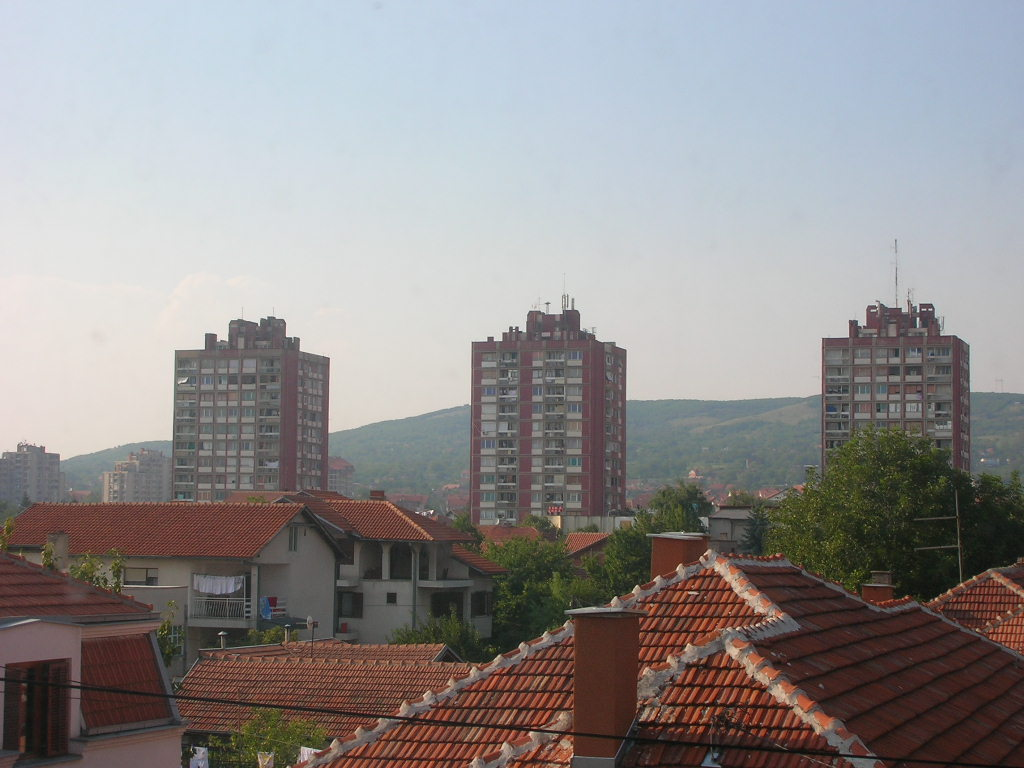
- Panorama of some of Pantelej's neighborhoods

- Coat of arms

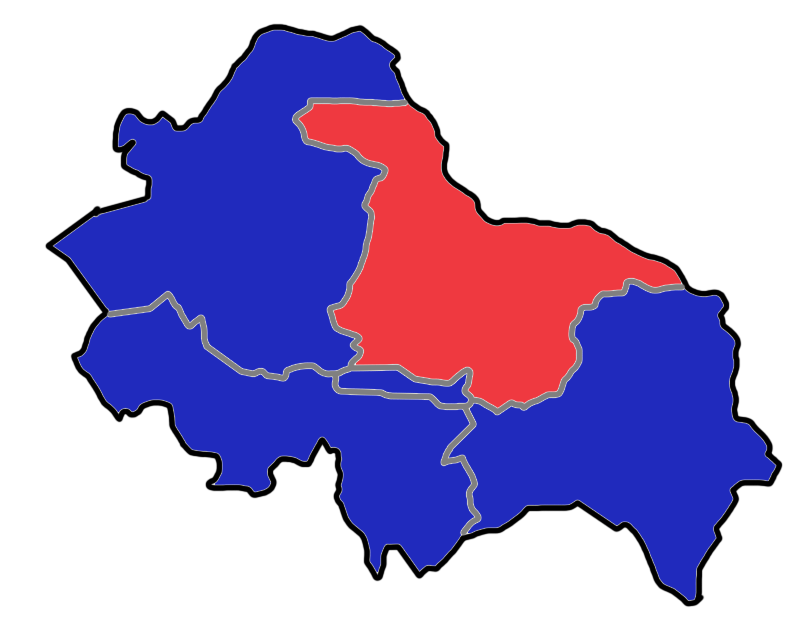
- Location of the municipality of Pantelej within City of Niš
- Country: Serbia
- Region: Southern and Eastern Serbia
- District: Nišava
- City: Niš
- Settlements: 14

Government
  - Mayor: Dragan Pavlović (SNS)

Area
  - Municipality: 140.97 km^{2} (54.43 sq mi)

Population (2011 census)
  - Urban: 34,724
  - Municipality: 53,486
- Time zone: UTC+1 (CET)
  - Summer (DST): UTC+2 (CEST)
- Postal code: 18000
- Area code: +381(0)18
- Car plates: NI
- Website: www.pantelej.org.rs

Pantelej (Serbian Cyrillic: Пантелеј) is one of five city municipalities which constitute the city of Niš. According to the 2011 census, the municipality has a population of 53,486 inhabitants.

== Geography ==
The municipality borders Crveni Krst municipality in the west, Svrljig municipality in the north, Niška Banja municipality in the south-east, and Medijana municipality in the south.

== Demographics ==
According to the 2011 census, the municipality had a population of 53,486 inhabitants, with 34,724 in the eponymous settlement.

=== Settlements ===
The municipality consists of 14 settlements, all of which are classified as rural, except for Pantelej, which is a part of a larger urban settlement of Niš.

- Brenica, population 522
- Vrelo, population 225
- Gornja Vrežina, population 1,147
- Gornji Matejevac, population 2,513
- Donja Vrežina, population 6,758
- Donji Matejevac, population 831
- Jasenovik, population 396
- Kamenica, population 3,745
- Knez Selo, population 865
- Malča, population 1,030
- Pantelej, population 34,724
- Oreovac, population 299
- Pasjača, population 219
- Cerje, population 212

=== Neighbourhoods ===
- Pantelej
- Jagodin Mala (partly)
- Durlan
- Vrežina
- Čalije
- Somborska
- Durlan 2
- Durlan 3

== International cooperation ==
Pantelej is twinned with the following cities and municipalities:

- Istočna Ilidža, Bosnia and Herzegovina (2021)

== See also ==
- Subdivisions of Serbia
- Niš
