= Gallipoli Serbs =

Serbian émigré population

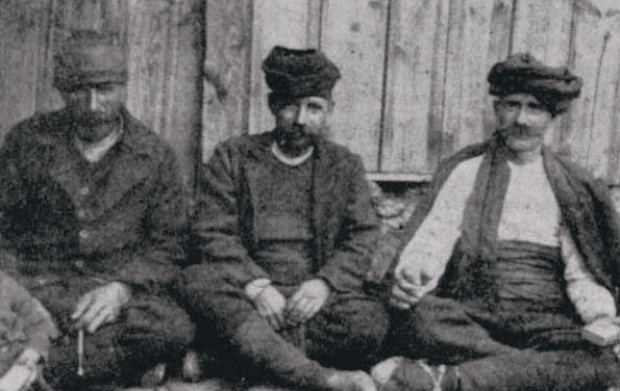
A group of Gallipoli Serbs in 1922.

Gallipoli Serbs (Serbian: галипољски Срби / galipoljski Srbi) were a group of Serbs from Serbian region named Srem (Syrmia) that were settled to Gallipoli by the Ottoman Empire some time after 1692 to engage in trade, then returned to the Niš region in the beginning of the 18th century, and finally settled by the Yugoslav authorities in Pehčevo in the beginning of the 20th century.

With the Austro-Turkish War, a group of Šumadinci from around Jagodina (present-day Central Serbia) were deported to Gallipoli sometime after 1692. In their epic stories, Jagodina is described as an ancient seat. In the beginning of the 18th century, these Gallipoli Serbs tried to flee to their hometown, but they were captured by Hadži Bešir-aga and were temporarily settled around Pirot. A part of these refugees, the Abdurahman efendija of Niš took and settled in his čiflik on the right side of the Nišava not far from the Niš fortress. From these čifliks, Jagodin Mala received its name. In the beginning of the 20th century, the Yugoslav authorities settled them in present-day North Macedonia, around Pehčevo, in the houses of emigrating Turks (that had left for Turkey). Their number in 1922 in Pehčevo was at least 1,100.

Their long distance from the Serbian core has resulted in a unique dialect (Old Shtokavian), with significant influence from the adjacent Greek and Turkish dialects, as well as other cultural traits.

== See also ==
- Serbs of North Macedonia
- Serbs in Turkey

== Sources ==
- Dimić, Miloš (2015). "Повест једног изгнанства". Ћирилица Београд.
- Emecen, Feridun M. (1997). "Istorija jedne migracije s početka XVI stoleća. Sremski izgnanici na Galipolјu". Историјски часопис 42-43 (1995-1996): Historical Review 42-43 (1995-1996). Istorijski institut Beograd: 237–253. GGKEY:8N4K5PNPTJC.
- Filipović, Milenko S. (1946). Galipoljski Srbi. Belgrade.
- Ivić, Pavle (1994). "O govoru Galipoljskih Srba" [On the speech of Gallipoli Serbs]. IKZS.
- Pavlović, Mirjana. "Миграција становништва са територије Србије у Турску у историјској перспективи" (PDF). Glasnik Etnografskog instituta SANU. SANU: 581–593.
- Tričković, Radmila (1983). "Галипољски Срби и Јагодина". Résumé. 29–30.
