= Gornja Vrežina =

- Village
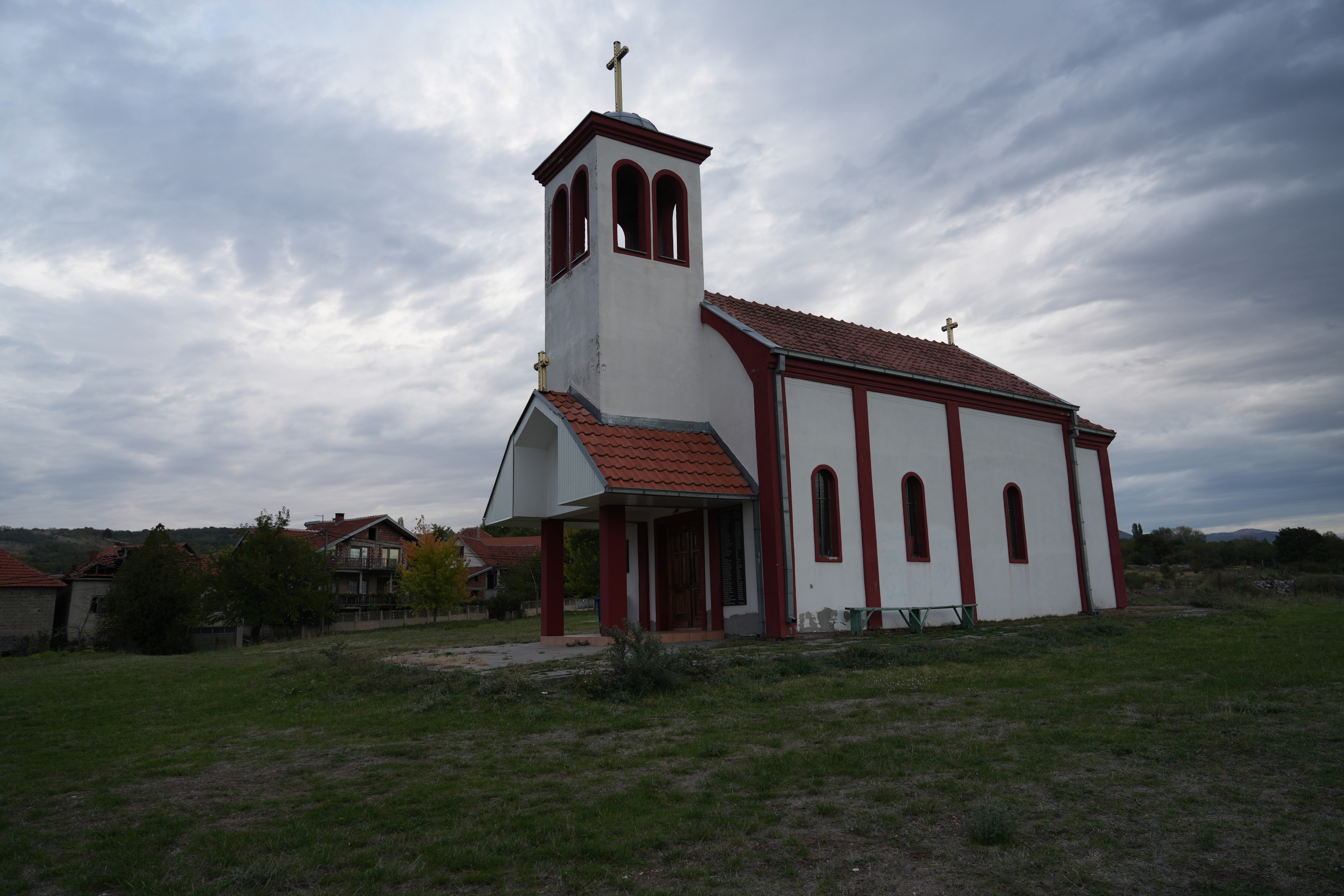
- Holy Trinity Church

- Location within Serbia
- Country: Serbia
- Region: Southern and Eastern Serbia
- District: Nišava
- City: Niš
- Municipality: Pantelej
- Time zone: UTC+1 (CET)
  - Summer (DST): UTC+2 (CEST)

Gornja Vrežina is a village situated in Niš municipality in Serbia.
