= Donja Vrežina =

Donja Vrežina Доња Врежина
- Village
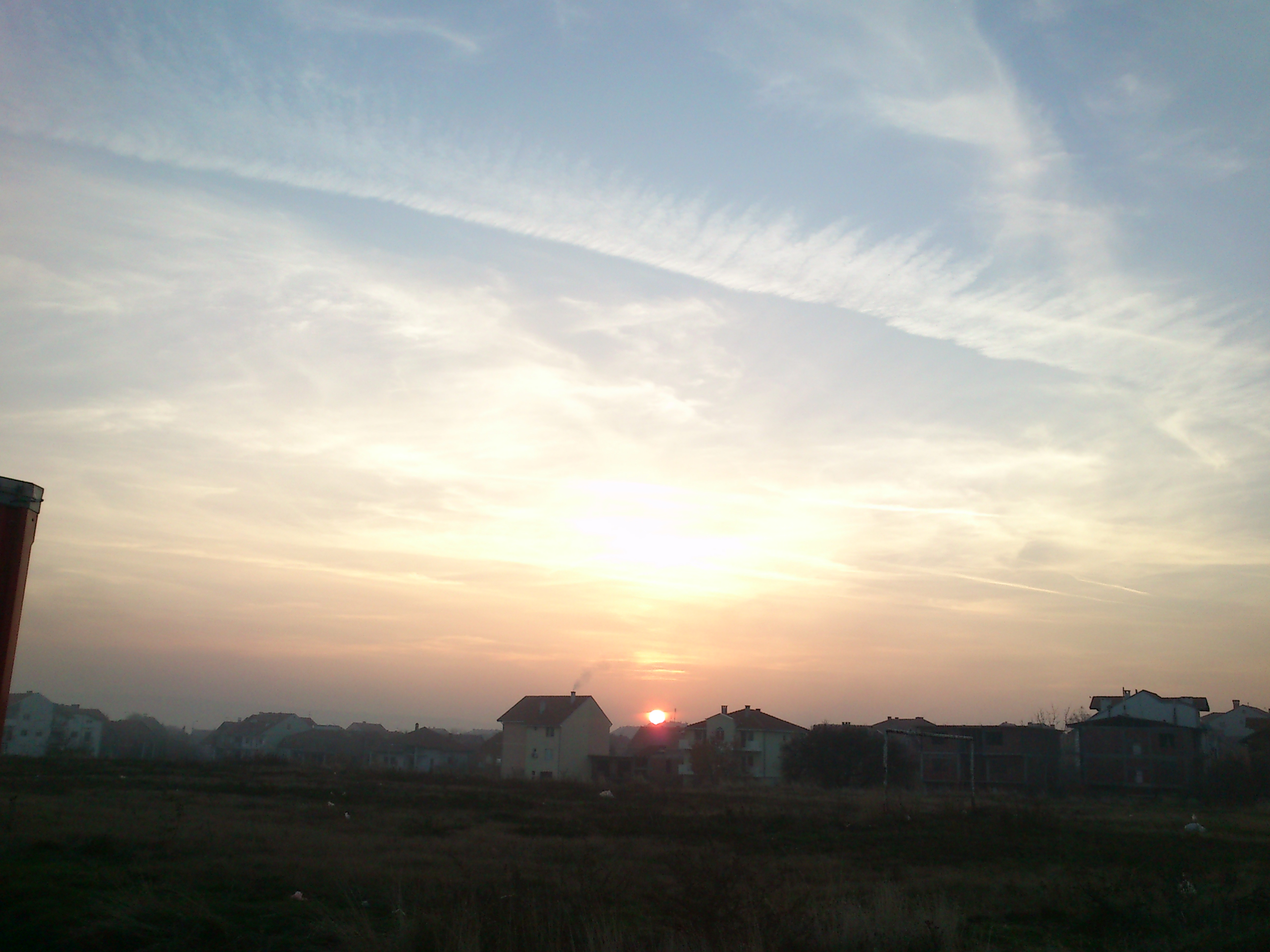
- Sunset at Donja Vrežina

- Location within Serbia
- Country: Serbia
- Region: Southern and Eastern Serbia
- District: Nišava
- City: Niš
- Municipality: Pantelej

Population (2011)
  - Total: 6,758
- Time zone: UTC+1 (CET)
  - Summer (DST): UTC+2 (CEST)

Donja Vrežina is a village in Serbia located in the municipality Pantelej, City of Niš, Nišava District. At the 2011 census, there were 6,758 inhabitants.

Notable people: Bane iz Vrežinu
