= Đalović =

Đalović (Serbian Cyrillic: Ђaлoвић; also transliterated Djalović) is a Serbian surname. It may refer to:

- Radomir Đalović (born 1982), Montenegrin football player
- Marko Đalović (born 1986), Serbian football player

== See also ==
- Đalovići, settlement
