= Gornji Matejevac =

- Village
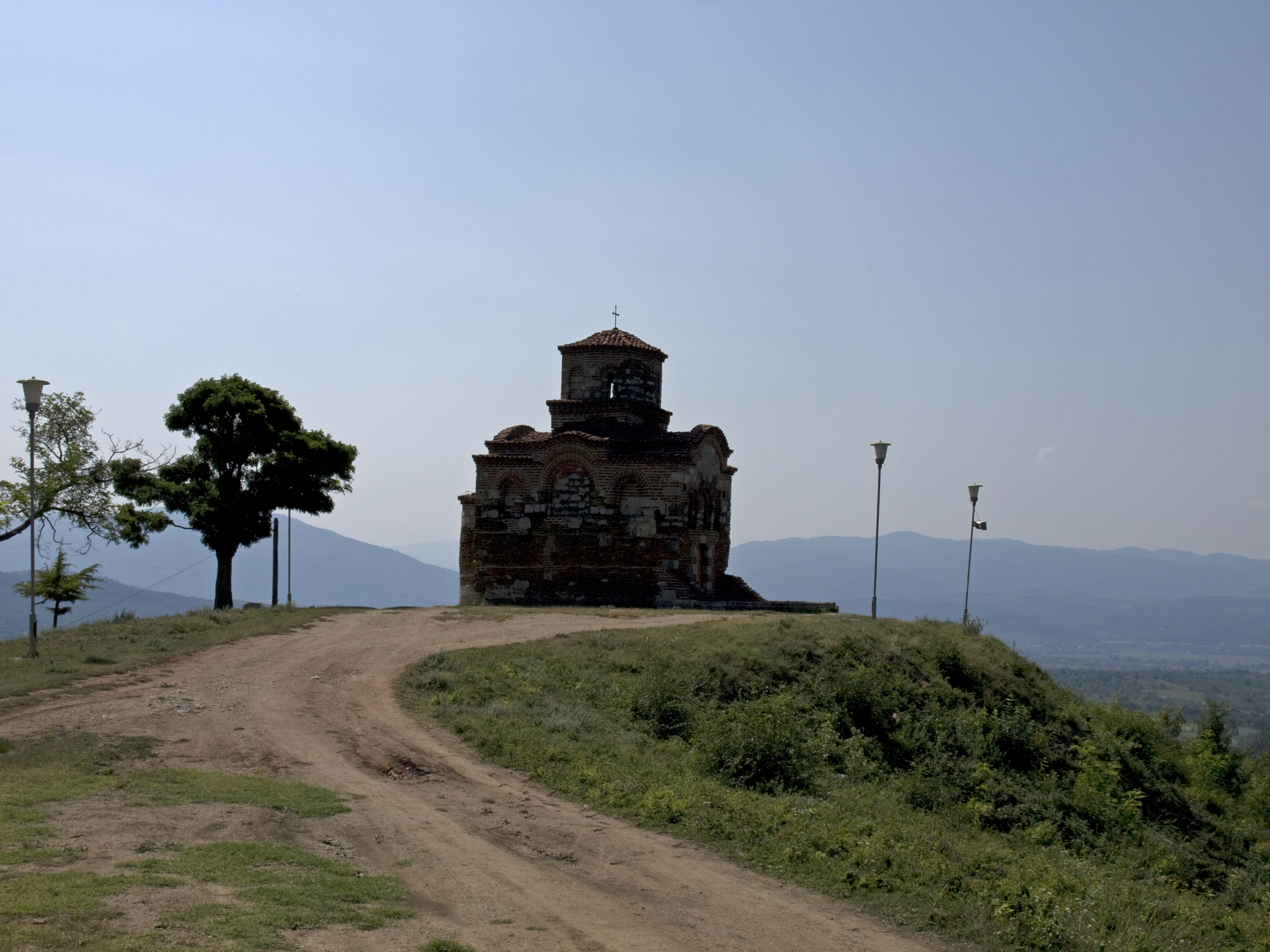
- Latin Church in Gornji Matejevac

- Location within Serbia
- Coordinates: 43°22′12″N 21°57′46″E
- Country: Serbia
- Region: Southern and Eastern Serbia
- District: Nišava
- City: Niš
- Municipality: Pantelej
- Time zone: UTC+1 (CET)
  - Summer (DST): UTC+2 (CEST)

Gornji Matejevac is a village situated in Pantelej municipality in the city of Niš, Serbia. It is located to the north of the center of Niš, on the northern slope of the Nišava river valley.

== Economy ==
=== Transportation ===
Gornji Matejevac lies north of the M1.12 highway which connects Niš with Sofia in Bulgaria. The town is connected with Niš by several paved roads.

== Culture and recreation ==
The most important cultural and historic monument of Gornji Matejevac is the so-called Latin Church, consecrated to Saint Nicholas. The Latin Church is one of the few survived buildings in Serbia which precede the Nemanjić dynasty period. The church is small, made of brick, has one nave and an apse. It is located on a hill above Gornji Matejevac. It is known that the church was used by citizens of Dubrovnik in the 16th century, and presumably this is where the name of Latin Church comes from. Between 1968 and 1974, the church underwent an extensive restoration. Since October 21, 1963 it is listed as a Cultural Heritage Monument. It is not known when the church was built precisely, but most likely it happened in the first half of the 11th century.
