= Vujičić =

Vujičić (Serbian: Вујичић) is a Serbian surname, a patronymic derived from Vujič or Vujica, hypocoristics of the given name Vuk (meaning "wolf"). It is borne by ethnic Serbs and Croats. It is one of numerous surnames derived from the root Vuk. It is present throughout former Yugoslavia. It may refer to:

- Nick Vujicic (born 1982), Australian motivational speaker, Serbian parentage
- Tanja Vujičić (born 1990), Bosnian beauty queen, ethnic Serb
- Godefroy Vujicic (born 1975), French cellist, Serbian parentage

== See also ==
- Wójcik
- Vujičići, Brčko
