= Durlan =

Durlan Дуpлaн
- Urban neighbourhood
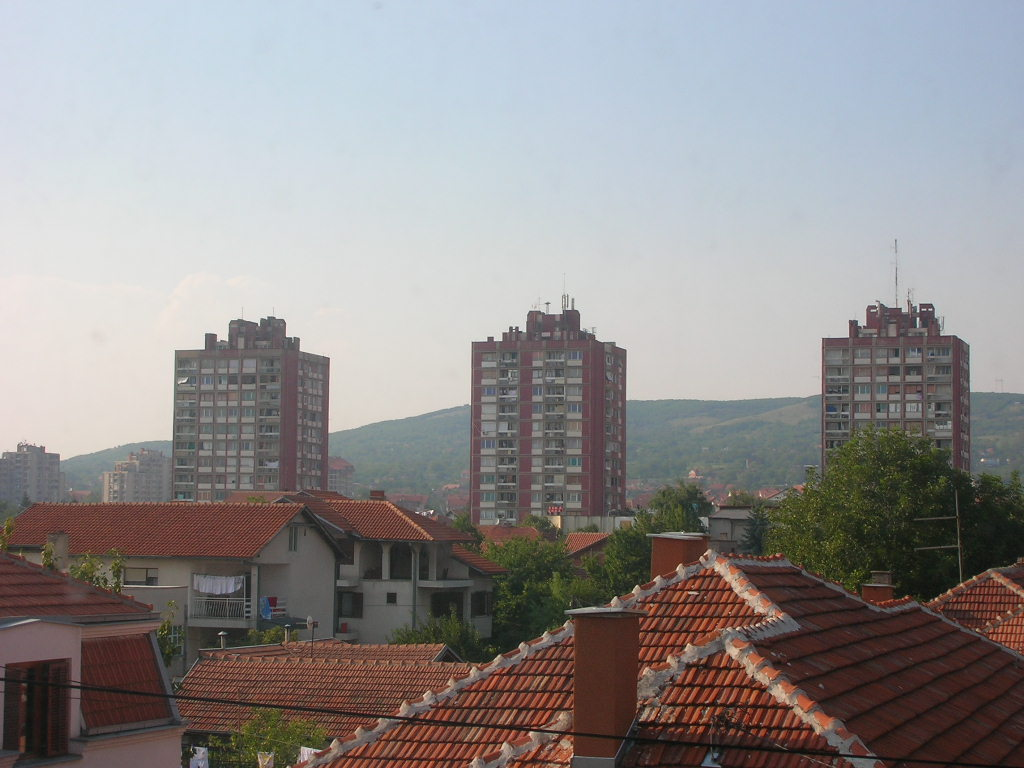
- 3 Aces - Tri Solitera

- Location within Serbia
- Country: Serbia
- Region: Southern and Eastern Serbia
- District: Nišava
- City: Niš
- Municipality: Pantelej
- Time zone: UTC+1 (CET)
  - Summer (DST): UTC+2 (CEST)

Durlan (Serbian Cyrillic: Дуpлaн) is a neighborhood of the city of Niš, Serbia. It is located within Niš municipality of Pantelej.

== Location ==
Durlan is located in the north-eastern outskirt of Niš. It is flat and bordered on the south by the Nišava river, on the east by Vrežina, on the north by the E80 road. The main street is named Knjaževačka.

== History ==
It is one of the newest neighborhoods of Niš built mostly after World War II. Durlan was named by the Aromanian settlers that emigrated from the area of today's North Macedonia and settled in surrounding villages by the 18th century, after the Aromanian word durlan, meaning "ghetto".

== Characteristics ==
Durlan is mostly residential. Individual family houses comprise most of the neighborhood, with notable exception of three large residential blocks built in the late 1970s, in the central area. These residential blocks are a local landmark. There is also a farmers' market (Durlanska pijaca/Дурланска пијаца). Durlan residents are known as Durlanci (Дурланци).

== Sports ==
The city government designated an area in the neighborhood for a sports center, which is already partially constructed. Durlan is also where the football team FK Sinđelić Niš is located.
