= Milovan Resavac =

- Милован Ресавац
- Born: Milovan; 1770s Stenjevac, Ottoman Empire
- Died: 31 May 1809; Čegar, Ottoman Empire
- Cause of death: Killed in action
- Military career
- Allegiance: Revolutionary Serbia (1804–1809)
- Service years: 1804–1809
- Rank: bimbaša
- Nicknames: Resavac, Bimbaša Milovan
- Unit: Resava army under Stevan Sinđelić
- Commands: Resava (Ćuprija area)
- Conflicts: First Serbian Uprising (1804–13)

Milovan Resavac (Serbian: Милован Ресавац; d. 1809), also known as Bimbaša Milovan (Бимбаша Милован), was a Serbian revolutionary, a comrade of vojvoda Stevan Sinđelić.

== Early life ==
Resavac was born in Stenjevac and lived in Radošin in the Ćuprija nahiya. He was a hajduk (brigand) with the rank of bimbaša.

In late 1803, Resavac joined the conspiration to overthrow the Dahije from the Sanjak of Smederevo. Among other conspirators of Resava were knez Petar of Resava, knez Stevan Sinđelić of Grabovac, Milija Zdravković and his cousin knez Pana from Lomnica, merchant Đurica Stočić from Svilajnac, priests Staniša from Crkvenac and Đorđe from Gložane, and host čika (uncle) Jova from Velika Resavica. The Resava region assembled on the order of Karađorđe through his son-in-law priest Miljko of the Miljkovo Monastery, and they upheld communication with Šumadija and the neighbouring Požarevac nahiya. An important contact of theirs was Karađorđe's associate Stojko Krivokuća of the Smederevo nahiya. The Dahije murdered knez Petar of Resava in the "Slaughter of the Knezes" (January 1804). The Serbs of the Ćuprija nahiya chose Sinđelić as their leader following the murder of Petar. The Ćuprija nahiya was known as the knežina of Resava among the people, who thus appointed Sinđelić the knez of Resava. When the uprising broke out in Šumadija, the Resava area was risen by Đurica Stočić, Stevan Sinđelić, Milovan Resavac, Milija Zdravković and hajduk buljubaša Ranče, among others.

== Uprising ==
In the beginning of the uprising Karađorđe's buljubaša Petar Jokić noted the following notables of Resava, among Sinđelić's men: bimbaša Milovan, advisor Milija Zdravković "from Brestovac", buljubaša Stanoje Rosić in Ćuprija, buljubaša Đurica Stočić from Vojska, and the heroic soldier and advisor priest Staniša of Crkvenac. The first fights with the Turks in the area came near Jasenjar on the Svilajnac–Ćuprija road, where forces under the command of Milija, Sinđelić and Krivokuća defeated them.

320 rebels in ambush attacked the kırcalı under Alija Gušanac, numbering 800–900 men, at Duboki Potok by the Morava river near Ćuprija on 23 March [O.S. 11 March]. The Serb detachment included Stojko Krivokuća, Petar Dobrnjac, Paulj Matejić, Milovan Resavac, Stevan Sinđelić and Milija Zdravković. The kırcalı had 80 killed, many wounded, and Gušanac's horse fell. They tried to break through to Jagodina but were defeated by Mladen Milovanović at Gilje, and then tried to push through by the right Morava banks via Svilajnac to Požarevac, but were countered by the Resava army under Milovan Resavac at the Hum hill and forced back to Ćuprija. Gušanac managed to break through to Jagodina in late March, owing partly to the weak Serbian defensive points around the town.

The Turks retreated to Ćuprija and then successfully attacked the Serbs at Grabovac, killing Krivokuća. Sinđelić and bimbaša Milovan Resavac commanded the Resava rebels throughout 1804 and stopped Turk attacks. While Resava was liberated, the Turks held Ćuprija for some time, receiving reinforcements from Paraćin and Niš, outside the Belgrade Pashalik.

In 1805, Ottoman sultan Selim III ordered that the Serbian uprising be quelled, and dispatched Hafiz Pasha from Niš with over 20,000 troops. On 18 August, Hafiz clashed with Serbian rebels at Ivankovac in the Ćuprija nahija and were decisively defeated. The rebels were commanded by Sinđelić, Milenko Stojković and Dobrnjac, who became the most famed among the rebels in Pomoravlje. This was a very important victory, as it expanded the military and political width of the uprising. According to contemporary accounts, Karađorđe promoted Sinđelić to vojvoda of Resava following the battle.

Sinđelić and the Resava force accompanied Dobrnjac in the skirmishes that pushed out the Turks from Ćuprija, Paraćin, Ražanj. Following this, they fortified Deligrad in order to thwart an invasion from the Sanjak of Niš. Sinđelić became based at Deligrad, from where he constantly fought Ottoman units, and successfully defended. The Ottomans were decisively defeated at Deligrad (September 1806). After Deligrad, the Serbian rebels waited for the large army of Ottoman commander Hurshid Pasha whose forces were stationed in the Niš Fortress.

Resavac fell at Kamenica (31 May 1809).

== See also ==
- List of Serbian Revolutionaries

== Sources ==
- Jovanović, Dobrivoje (2014) [2009]. "ПРВЕ БОРБЕ СА ТУРЦИМА И ОСЛОБОЂЕЊЕ ЈАГОДИНЕ 1804.ГОДИНЕ" (PDF). Прошлост. 3. Историјски архив Јагодина.
- Milićević, Milan Đ. (1888). Поменик знаменитих људи у српског народа новијега доба. Издање Чупићеве задужбине – via Archive.org.
- Nenadović, Konstantin N. (1884). Живот и дела великог Ђорђа Петровића Кара-Ђорђа. Vol. II (1 ed.). Vienna: У Штампарији Јована Н. Вернаја – via Google Books.
- Novaković, Stojan (1904). Устанак на дахије 1804. Штампано у Државној штампарији – via Archive.org.
- Protić, Kosta (1893). "Ратни догађаји из првога српског устанка под Карађорђем Петровићем 1804—1813". Годишњица Николе Чупића. XIII. Državna štamparija.
- Stojančević, Vladimir (1991). "Ћупријска нахија – Ресава у време Иванковачке битке 1805. године" (PDF). Balcanica. 22. Belgrade: SANU: 101–109.
- Vukićević, Milenko M. (1907). Карађорђе (1752–1804). Vol. 1. Државна штампарија Краљевине Србије – via Archive.org.
- Vukićević, Milenko M. (1912). Карађорђе (1804–1807) (PDF). Vol. 2. Државна штампарија Краљевине Србије. pp. 51, 67, 501 – via Управа за заједничке послове републичких органа (Government of Serbia).
