= Đurica Stočić =

Serbian revolutionary

- Ђурица Сточић
- Born: 17XX; Svilajnac, Ottoman Empire
- Military career
- Allegiance: Revolutionary Serbia (1804–?)
- Service years: 1804–?
- Rank: buljubaša
- Nickname: Đura
- Unit: Stevan Sinđelić
- Commands: Ćuprija
- Conflicts: First Serbian Uprising (1804–13)

Đurica Stočić (Serbian: Ђурица Сточић), also known as Đura (Ђура), was a Serbian revolutionary, a comrade of vojvoda Stevan Sinđelić. He was the representative of the Ćuprija nahiya in the Governing Council for a short period in 1805.

== Life ==
Đurica was born in Svilajnac and lived in Vojska, in the Ćuprija nahiya. His family was affluent, and he was a merchant by trade, having started an enterprise as a youngster with his neighbour Ilija and earned repute in the area. During the Janissary revolts of the 1790s, he volunteered in the Serbian militia (commanded by Stanko Arambašić) that supported Vizier Hadji Mustafa Pasha. As such, he participated in the campaign against renegade Osman Pazvantoglu.

In late 1803, Đurica joined the conspiration to overthrow the Dahije from the Sanjak of Smederevo. Among other conspirators of Resava were knez Petar of Resava, Milija Zdravković and his cousin knez Pana from Lomnica, priests Staniša from Crkvenac and Đorđe from Gložane, bimbaša Milovan Resavac from Radošin, knez Stevan Sinđelić from Grabovac, and host čika (uncle) Jova from Velika Resavica. The Resava region assembled on the order of Karađorđe through his son-in-law priest Miljko of the Miljkovo Monastery, and they upheld communication with Šumadija and the neighbouring Požarevac nahiya. An important contact of theirs was Karađorđe's associate Stojko Krivokuća of the Smederevo nahiya.

The Dahije murdered knez Petar of Resava in the "Slaughter of the Knezes" (January 1804). The Serbs of the Ćuprija nahiya chose Sinđelić as their leader following the murder of Petar. The Ćuprija nahiya was known as the knežina of Resava among the people, who thus appointed Sinđelić the knez of Resava. When the uprising broke out in Šumadija, the Resava area was risen by Đurica Stočić, Stevan Sinđelić, Milovan Resavac, Milija Zdravković and hajduk buljubaša Ranče, among others.

Đurica fought under the command of vojvoda Stevan Sinđelić, and was given the rank of buljubaša. In the beginning of the uprising Karađorđe's buljubaša Petar Jokić noted the following notables of Resava, among Sinđelić's men: bimbaša Milovan of Stenjevac, advisor Milija Zdravković "from Brestovac", buljubaša Stanoje Rosić in Ćuprija, buljubaša Đurica Stočić from Vojska, and the heroic soldier and advisor priest Staniša of Crkvenac. The first fights with the Turks in the area came near Jasenjar on the Svilajnac–Ćuprija road, where forces under the command of Milija, Sinđelić and Krivokuća defeated them. The Turks retreated to Ćuprija and then successfully attacked the Serbs at Grabovac, killing Krivokuća. Sinđelić and bimbaša Milovan Resavac commanded the Resava rebels throughout 1804 and stopped Turk attacks. While Resava was liberated, the Turks held Ćuprija for some time, receiving reinforcements from Paraćin and Niš, outside the Belgrade Pashalik.

In 1804–05 the administration of rebel territory was established, with Karađorđe and the Governing Council representing the supreme rule in liberated Serbia. The nahija knezes and voivodes were representatives of their administrative areas in the Assembly of Rebel Leaders. Đurica Stočić was the representative of the Ćuprija nahija for a short period until the end of 1805, being replaced by Milija Zdravković who was called Sinđelić's "right hand".

In 1805, Ottoman sultan Selim III ordered that the Serbian uprising be quelled, and dispatched Hafiz Pasha from Niš with over 20,000 troops. On 18 August, Hafiz clashed with Serbian rebels at Ivankovac in the Ćuprija nahija and were decisively defeated. This was a very important victory, as it expanded the military and political width of the uprising.

== See also ==
- List of Serbian Revolutionaries

Political offices
New title Serbian uprising	Representative of Ćuprija nahija (Cabinet of Matija Nenadović); 27 Aug 1805 – late 1805	Succeeded by Milija Zdravković

== Sources ==
- Bogićević, Mirko (1989). Stevan Sinđelić, resavski vojvoda, i njegovo doba. Vuk Karadžić. ISBN 978-86-307-0279-2.
- Milićević, Milan Đ. (1888). Поменик знаменитих људи у српског народа новијега доба. Издање Чупићеве задужбине. pp. 172–173, 649 – via Archive.org.
- Nenadović, Konstantin N. (1884). Живот и дела великог Ђорђа Петровића Кара-Ђорђа. Vol. II (1 ed.). Vienna: У Штампарији Јована Н. Вернаја. pp. 806–808 – via Google Books.
- Milisavljević, Miloš (1954). "Устаничке биографије: Ђурица Сточић". In Perović, Radoslav (ed.). Прилози за историју првог српског устанка: необјављена грађа. Народна књига. pp. 39–42.
- Stojančević, Vladimir (1991). "Ћупријска нахија – Ресава у време Иванковачке битке 1805. године" (PDF). Balcanica (22). Belgrade: SANU: 101–109.
