= Milija Zdravković =

Serbian revolutionary

- Милија Здравковић
- Born: c. 1755; Lomnica, Ottoman Empire
- Died: 1814; Belgrade, Ottoman Empire
- Cause of death: Execution
- Other name: Miloje
- Children: Milosav Zdravković
- Military career
- Allegiance: Revolutionary Serbia (1804–13)
- Service years: 1804–13
- Rank: komandant
- Nickname: Ćor-Milija ("blind Milija")
- Unit: Stevan Sinđelić
- Commands: Ćuprija
- Conflicts: First Serbian Uprising (1804–13)

Milija Zdravković (Serbian Cyrillic: Милија Здравковић; c. 1755–1814) was a Serbian revolutionary and obor-knez during the First Serbian Uprising and a representative of the Ćuprija nahija of Revolutionary Serbia in the cabinet of Matija Nenadović in 1805.

== Early life ==
The Zdravković was a large family. Milija Zdravković was born in Lomnica, in the Resava knežina of the Ćuprija nahiya. His cousin was knez Pantelija Knežević-Pana (Пана), also born in Lomnica, who was a Serbian Free Corps veteran in the Austro-Turkish War. Milija lived in Brestovo (also known as Brestovac). There are sources calling him a priest.

Milija was blind in one eye and was therefore also known as Ćor-Milija (Ћор-Милија, "blind Milija").

== Uprising ==
In late 1803, Milija and his cousin Pana joined the conspiration to overthrow the Dahije from the Sanjak of Smederevo. Among other conspirators of Resava were knez Petar of Resava, merchant Đurica Stočić from Svilajnac, priests Staniša from Crkvenac and Đorđe from Gložane, bimbaša Milovan Resavac from Radošin, knez Stevan Sinđelić from Grabovac, and host čika (uncle) Jova from Velika Resavica. The Resava region assembled on the order of Karađorđe through his son-in-law priest Miljko of the Miljkovo Monastery, and they upheld communication with Šumadija and the neighbouring Požarevac nahiya. An important contact of theirs was Karađorđe's associate Stojko Krivokuća of the Smederevo nahiya.

The Dahije murdered knez Petar of Resava in the "Slaughter of the Knezes" (January 1804). The Serbs of the Ćuprija nahiya chose Sinđelić as their leader following the murder of Petar. The Ćuprija nahiya was known as the knežina of Resava among the people, who thus appointed Sinđelić the knez of Resava. When the uprising broke out in Šumadija, the Resava area was risen by Đurica Stočić, Stevan Sinđelić, Milovan Resavac, Milija Zdravković and buljubaša Ranče, among others.

Milija fought under the command of vojvoda Stevan Sinđelić, and was his advisor. In the beginning of the uprising Karađorđe's buljubaša Petar Jokić noted the following notables of Resava, among Sinđelić's men: bimbaša Milovan of Stenjevac, advisor Milija Zdravković "from Brestovac", buljubaša Stanoje Rosić in Ćuprija, buljubaša Đurica Stočić from Vojska, and the heroic soldier and advisor priest Staniša of Crkvenac. The first fights with the Turks in the area came near Jasenjar on the Svilajnac–Ćuprija road, where forces under the command of Milija, Sinđelić and Krivokuća defeated them. The Turks retreated to Ćuprija and then successfully attacked the Serbs at Grabovac, killing Krivokuća. Sinđelić and bimbaša Milovan Resavac commanded the Resava rebels throughout 1804 and stopped Turk attacks. While Resava was liberated, the Turks held Ćuprija for some time, receiving reinforcements from Paraćin and Niš, outside the Belgrade Pashalik.

In 1804–05 the administration of rebel territory was established, with Karađorđe and the Governing Council representing the supreme rule in liberated Serbia. The nahija knezes and voivodes were representatives of their administrative areas in the Assembly of Rebel Leaders. Đurica Stočić was the representative of the Ćuprija nahija for a short period until the end of 1805, being replaced by Milija Zdravković who was called Sinđelić's "right hand". Up until then, Milija had been the komandant of the Ćuprija fortress after its takeover.

In 1805, Ottoman sultan Selim III ordered that the Serbian uprising be quelled, and dispatched Hafiz Pasha from Niš with over 20,000 troops. On 18 August, Hafiz clashed with Serbian rebels at Ivankovac in the Ćuprija nahija and were decisively defeated. This was a very important victory, as it expanded the military and political width of the uprising.

Milija was appointed obor-knez of Resava at some point.

Accused by the Ottomans of being part of the Hadži-Prodan's rebellion, Milija, Stevan Jakovljević and Stanoje Glavaš were executed along with other Serb leaders. Milija was executed in Belgrade by Skopljak.

== Family ==
Milija had six sons. The oldest son Milosav Zdravković received the title knez of Resava following Milija's death.

== See also ==
- List of Serbian Revolutionaries

== Sources ==
- Batalaka, Lazar Arsenijević (1898). Историја српског устанка. Vol. I. Izd. Batalakinoga fonda.
- Bogićević, Mirko (1989). Stevan Sinđelić, resavski vojvoda, i njegovo doba. Vuk Karadžić. ISBN 978-86-307-0279-2.
- Janković, Dragoslav (1984). Srpska država provog ustanka. Nolit.
- Milićević, Milan Đ. (1888). Поменик знаменитих људи у српског народа новијега доба. Издање Чупићеве задужбине. pp. 172–173, 649 – via Archive.org.
- Milisavljević, Miloš (1954). "Устаничке биографије: Здравковићи-Ресавци". In Perović, Radoslav (ed.). Прилози за историју првог српског устанка: необјављена грађа. Народна књига. pp. 41-.
- Nenadović, Konstantin N. (1884). Живот и дела великог Ђорђа Петровића Кара-Ђорђа. Vol. II (1 ed.). Vienna: У Штампарији Јована Н. Вернаја. pp. 806–808 – via Google Books.
- Stojančević, Vladimir (1991). "Ћупријска нахија – Ресава у време Иванковачке битке 1805. године" (PDF). Balcanica. 22. Belgrade: SANU: 101–109.
