= Milija (name) =

Milija is a masculine name of Serbian origin that is a form of the name Milan. It comes from the Slavic element milu meaning "gracious, dear". Milijana is the feminine form.

- Milija Aleksic (1951–2012), English footballer
- Milija and Pavle Bakić, Turkish footballers
- Milija Brkić (born 1954), Serbian footballer
- Milija Jovanović (born 1953), Serbian politician
- Milija Marković (1812-1877), Serbian painter and priest
- Milija Miković (born 1994), Montenegrin basketball player
- Milija Miletić (born 1968), Serbian politician
- Milija Mrdak (born 1991), Serbian volleyball player
- Milija Pavićević (1943–2011), physician, neuropsychiatrist, Doctor of Medical Sciences, primarius, and professor
- Milija Zdravković (1765–1814) Serbian politician
- Milija Žižić (born 1979), Serbian footballer

== Milijana ==
- Milijana Maganjić (born 1981), Croatian basketball player
- Milijana Nikolic (born 1975), Serbian-Australian opera singer
- Milijana Sakić (born 1988), Serbian politician

== See also ==
- Milia (disambiguation)
- Milan (given name)
