= Resavac =

Resavac (Serbian: Ресавац) is a demonym of the Resava region of Serbia. Notable people with the name include:

- Milosav Zdravković-Resavac, Serbian revolutionary
- Milija Zdravković-Resavac, Serbian revolutionary
- Milovan Resavac, Serbian revolutionary
