= Maganjić =

Maganjić is a Croatian surname. Notable people with the surname include:

- Josip Maganjić (born 1999), Croatian football forward
- Milijana Maganjić (born 1981), Croatian basketball player
