= Gataullin =

Gataullin (Russian: Гатауллин) is a masculine surname of Tatar origin, its feminine counterpart is Gataullina. Notable people with the surname include:

- Aksana Gataullina (born 2000), Russian pole vaulter
- Milia Gataullina (born 1971), Russian graphic artist
- Radion Gataullin (born 1965), Soviet pole vaulter
- Ruslan Gataullin (born 1979), Russian long jumper, brother of Radion
