= Milium (disambiguation) =

A Milium (pl:Milia) is a small cyst near the surface of the skin or on the roof of the mouth

Milium may also refer to:

- Milium (plant), a genus of grasses
- Milium, a lining material by Deering Milliken, sold in the 1950s and early 1960s.

== See also ==
- Milia (disambiguation)
