= Stevan Sinđelić =

Serbian revolutionary commander (1771–1809)

- Stevan Sinđelić
- Born: c. 1770; Svilajnac, Ottoman Empire
- Died: 19 May 1809 (aged 37–38); Niš, Ottoman Empire
- Military career
- Allegiance: Revolutionary Serbia
- Service years: 1804–1809
- Rank: vojvoda (1805)
- Units: Resava
- Conflicts: First Serbian Uprising: Battle of Ivankovac; Battle of Deligrad; Battle of Čegar †

Stevan Sinđelić (Serbian Cyrillic: Стеван Синђелић; 1770–1809) was a Serbian revolutionary commander active in Resava during the First Serbian Uprising (1804–1813) against the Ottoman Empire. As the commander of the Resava Brigade, he fought in many battles and skirmishes against Ottoman forces, including the Battle of Ivankovac in 1805 and the Battle of Deligrad in 1806. He is remembered for his actions during the Battle of Čegar in 1809, in which he and the Resava Brigade found themselves surrounded by the Ottomans. Encircled and without much chance of survival, Sinđelić ignited the gunpowder kegs in the powder cave, creating an enormous explosion that killed him, along with all of the Serbian and Ottoman soldiers in his trench.

== Early life ==
Sinđelić was born in c. 1770 in the village of Vojska in the Ćuprija nahiya, the son of Radovan and Sinđelija. After his father had died in young age, his mother feared for Turk oppression and married a Radojko in Grabovac. His mother thus gave him the matronymic Sinđelić. Sinđelić participated as a volunteer in the Serbian Free Corps during the Austro-Turkish War (1788–1791). He was a momak (fellow) of obor-knez of Resava, Petar from Gložane. He was appointed knez of Grabovac prior to the uprising.

In late 1803, Sinđelić joined the conspiration to overthrow the Dahije from the Sanjak of Smederevo. Among other conspirators of Resava were knez Petar of Resava, Milija Zdravković and his cousin knez Pana from Lomnica, merchant Đurica Stočić from Svilajnac, priests Staniša from Crkvenac and Đorđe from Gložane, bimbaša Milovan Resavac from Radošin, and host čika (uncle) Jova from Velika Resavica. The Resava region assembled on the order of Karađorđe through his son-in-law priest Miljko of the Miljkovo Monastery, and they upheld communication with Šumadija and the neighbouring Požarevac nahiya. An important contact of theirs was Karađorđe's associate Stojko Krivokuća of the Smederevo nahiya.

The Dahije murdered knez Petar of Resava in the "Slaughter of the Knezes" (January 1804). The Serbs of the Ćuprija nahiya chose Sinđelić as their leader following the murder of Petar. The Ćuprija nahiya was known as the knežina of Resava among the people, who thus appointed Sinđelić the knez of Resava. When the uprising broke out in Šumadija, the Resava area was risen by Đurica Stočić, Stevan Sinđelić, Milovan Resavac, Milija Zdravković and hajduk buljubaša Ranče, among others.

== Uprising ==
=== 1804–06 ===
In the beginning of the uprising Karađorđe's buljubaša Petar Jokić noted the following notables of Resava, among Sinđelić's men: bimbaša Milovan of Stenjevac, advisor Milija Zdravković "from Brestovac", buljubaša Stanoje Rosić in Ćuprija, buljubaša Đurica Stočić from Vojska, and the heroic soldier and advisor priest Staniša of Crkvenac. The first fights with the Turks in the area came near Jasenjar on the Svilajnac–Ćuprija road, where forces under the command of Milija, Sinđelić and Krivokuća defeated them. The Turks retreated to Ćuprija and then successfully attacked the Serbs at Grabovac, killing Krivokuća. Sinđelić and bimbaša Milovan Resavac commanded the Resava rebels throughout 1804 and stopped Turk attacks. While Resava was liberated, the Turks held Ćuprija for some time, receiving reinforcements from Paraćin and Niš, outside the Belgrade Pashalik.

In 1804–05 the administration of rebel territory was established, with Karađorđe and the Governing Council representing the supreme rule in liberated Serbia. The nahija knezes and voivodes were representatives of their administrative areas in the Assembly of Rebel Leaders. Đurica Stočić was the representative of the Ćuprija nahija in the Governing Council for a short period until the end of 1805, being replaced by Milija Zdravković who was called Sinđelić's "right hand".

In 1805, Ottoman sultan Selim III ordered that the Serbian uprising be quelled, and dispatched Hafiz Pasha from Niš with over 20,000 troops. On 18 August, Hafiz clashed with Serbian rebels at Ivankovac in the Ćuprija nahija and were decisively defeated. The rebels were commanded by Sinđelić, Milenko Stojković and Petar Dobrnjac, who became the most famed among the rebels in Pomoravlje. This was a very important victory, as it expanded the military and political width of the uprising. According to contemporary accounts, Karađorđe promoted Sinđelić to vojvoda of Resava following the battle.

Sinđelić and the Resava forces accompanied Petar Dobrnjac in the skirmishes that pushed out the Turks from Ćuprija, Paraćin, Ražanj. Following this, they fortified Deligrad in order to thwart an invasion from the Sanjak of Niš. The combined units of Milisav Đorđević, Stevan Sinđelić, Petar Dobrnjac, Ilija Stošić and Paulj Matejić, numbering 800, destroyed the Turks commanded by Osman Pazvantoğlu, numbering 3,000, at Dživdžibare. Sinđelić became based at Deligrad, from where he constantly fought Ottoman units, and successfully defended. The Ottomans were decisively defeated at Deligrad (September 1806).

=== 1807–09 ===
After Deligrad, the Serbian rebels waited for the large army of Ottoman commander Hurşid Paşa whose forces were stationed in the Niš Fortress.

Sinđelić's Brigade fought the Ottomans in areas that were located south of the city of Niš. His detachment became entrenched in the village of Kamenica on Čegar hill, not far from the Ottoman front-line. The Serbs then launched several attacks against the Niš Fortress, but each time they were repulsed by the numerically superior Ottomans. After a two-month-long struggle, the Ottomans engaged in a counter-attack against the Serb positions on 19 May 1809 (N.S. 31 May). Sinđelić and his Brigade became separated from the remainder of the Serb guerrilla positions and he and his men resisted fiercely. With hundreds of Ottoman soldiers pouring into the trench, Sinđelić saw that his Brigade had little hope of staving off the Ottoman offensive. Hand-to-hand combat ensued in the trenches. Sinđelić decided to fire his flintlock pistol into a pile of gunpowder kegs. When the Ottomans swarmed the trench from all sides and headed for him, Sinđelić squeezed the trigger. The Serbs who remained in the trench with Sinđelić, as well as the attacking Ottomans, were all caught in the enormous explosion and perished. According to legend his famous last words were: "Save yourselves brothers, who wants and who can! Those who stay will die!". The fall of Sinđelić's trench forced the other units of the Serbian Army to retreat back to the town of Deligrad, where they entrenched themselves in a new, fortified front line. Some 3,000 revolutionaries and 6,000 Ottoman troops were killed in the battle.

The Ottomans, following orders given by Hurşid Paşa of Niš, erected the famous Skull Tower (Ćele-Kula) on the road to Constantinople, containing 952 Serbian revolutionaries' skulls, as a warning to the Serbs and other Balkan peoples about any future dissent. Today, 57 skulls remain embedded into the walls of the Skull Tower in Niš.

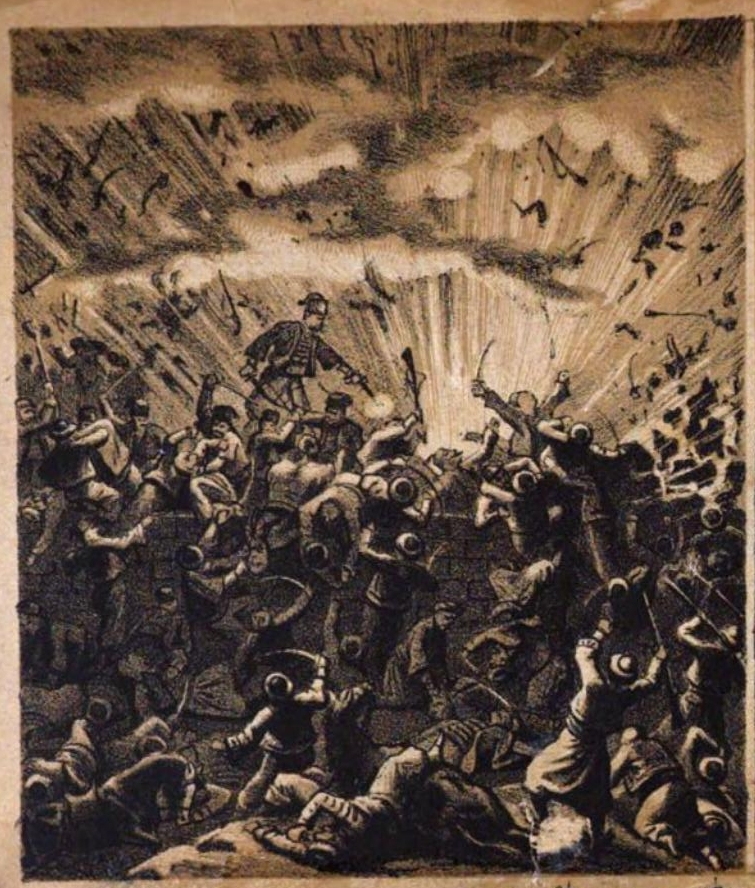
Sinđelić blowing up the powder kegs (1883 illustration).

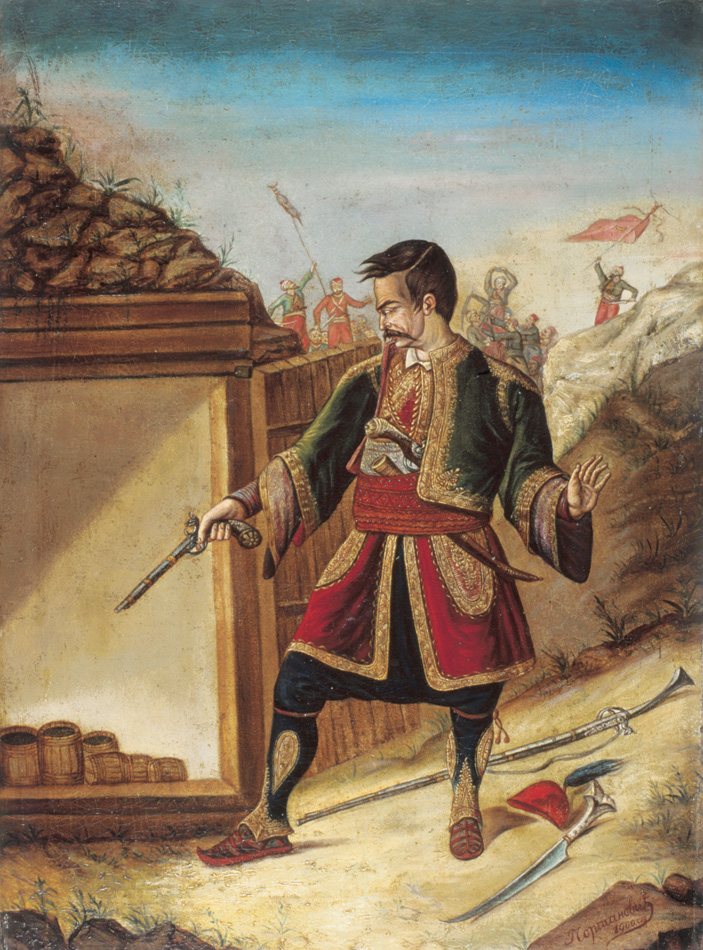
Sinđelić at Čegar Hill (1900), by Pavle Čortanović.

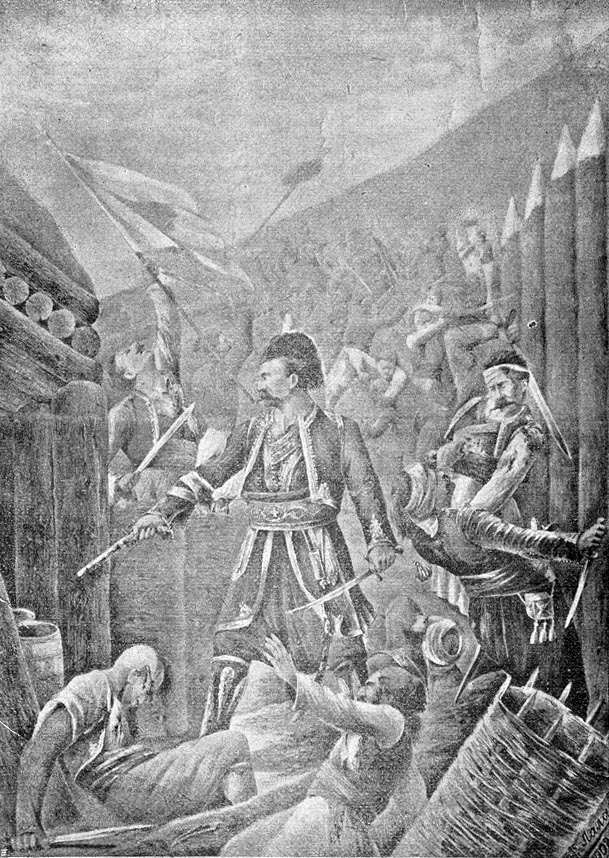
Sinđelić surrounded (1904 illustration).

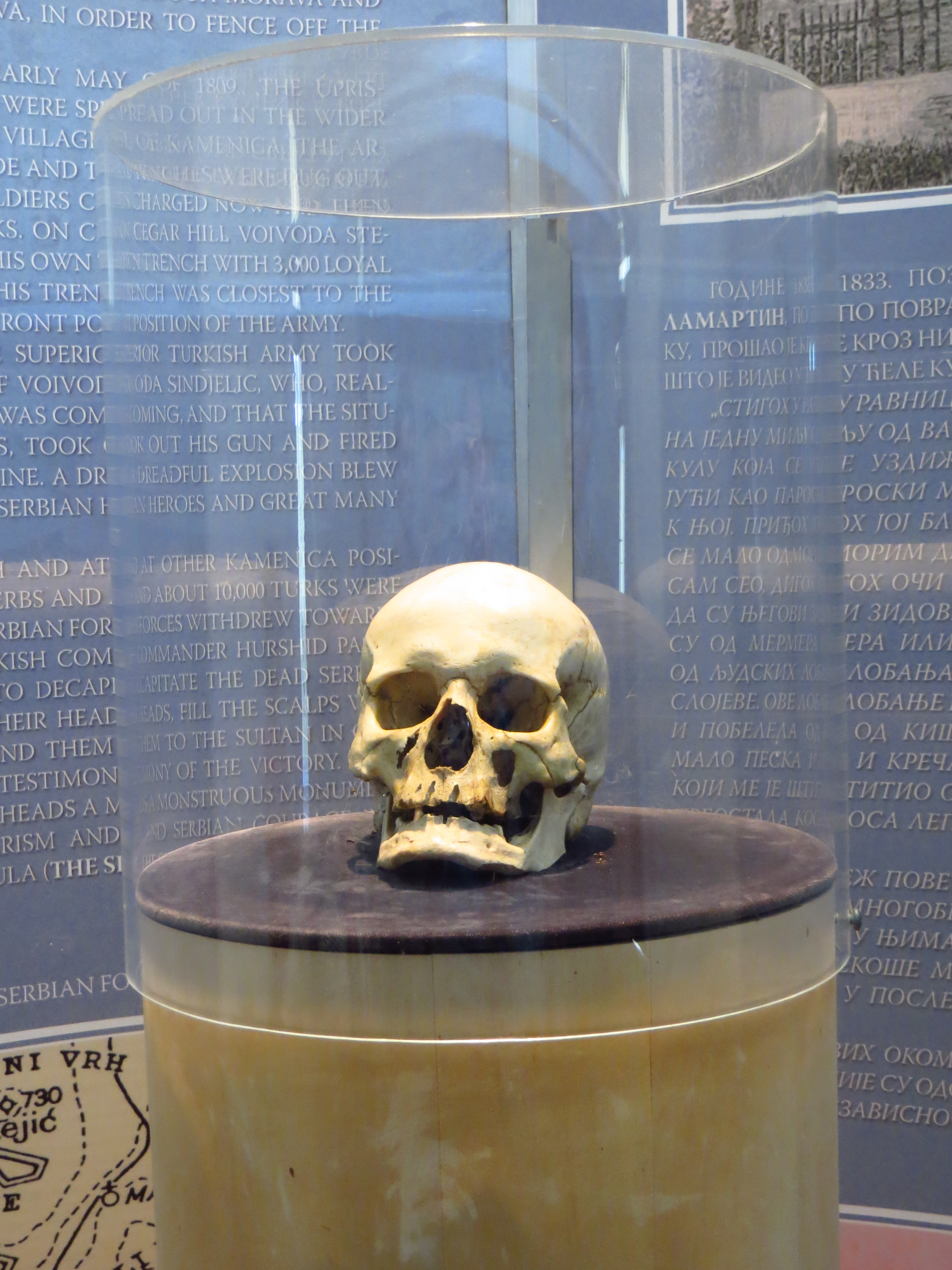
Skull of Stefan Sinđelić on display at the Skull Tower.

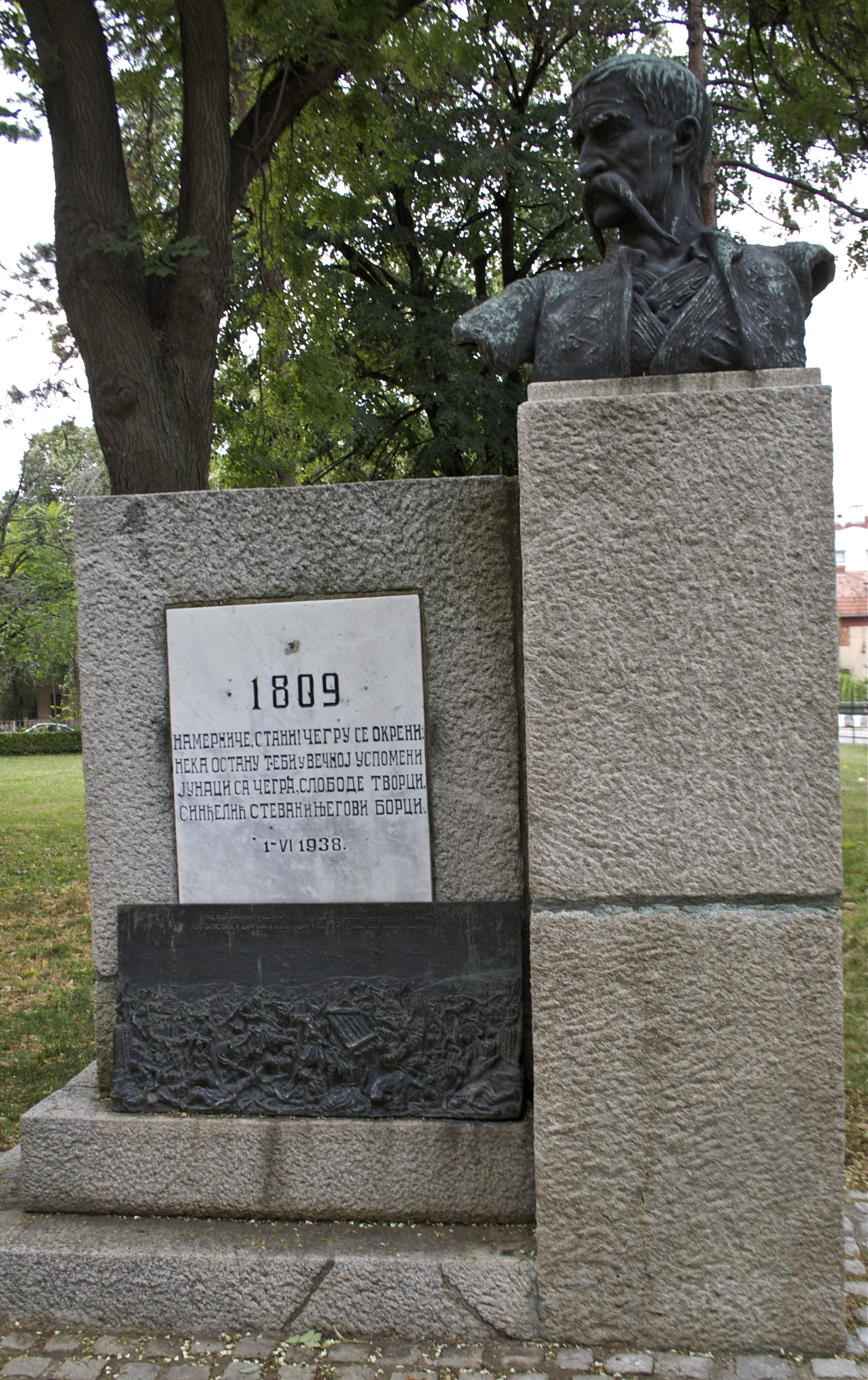
Bust of Stefan Sinđelić beside the Skull Tower.

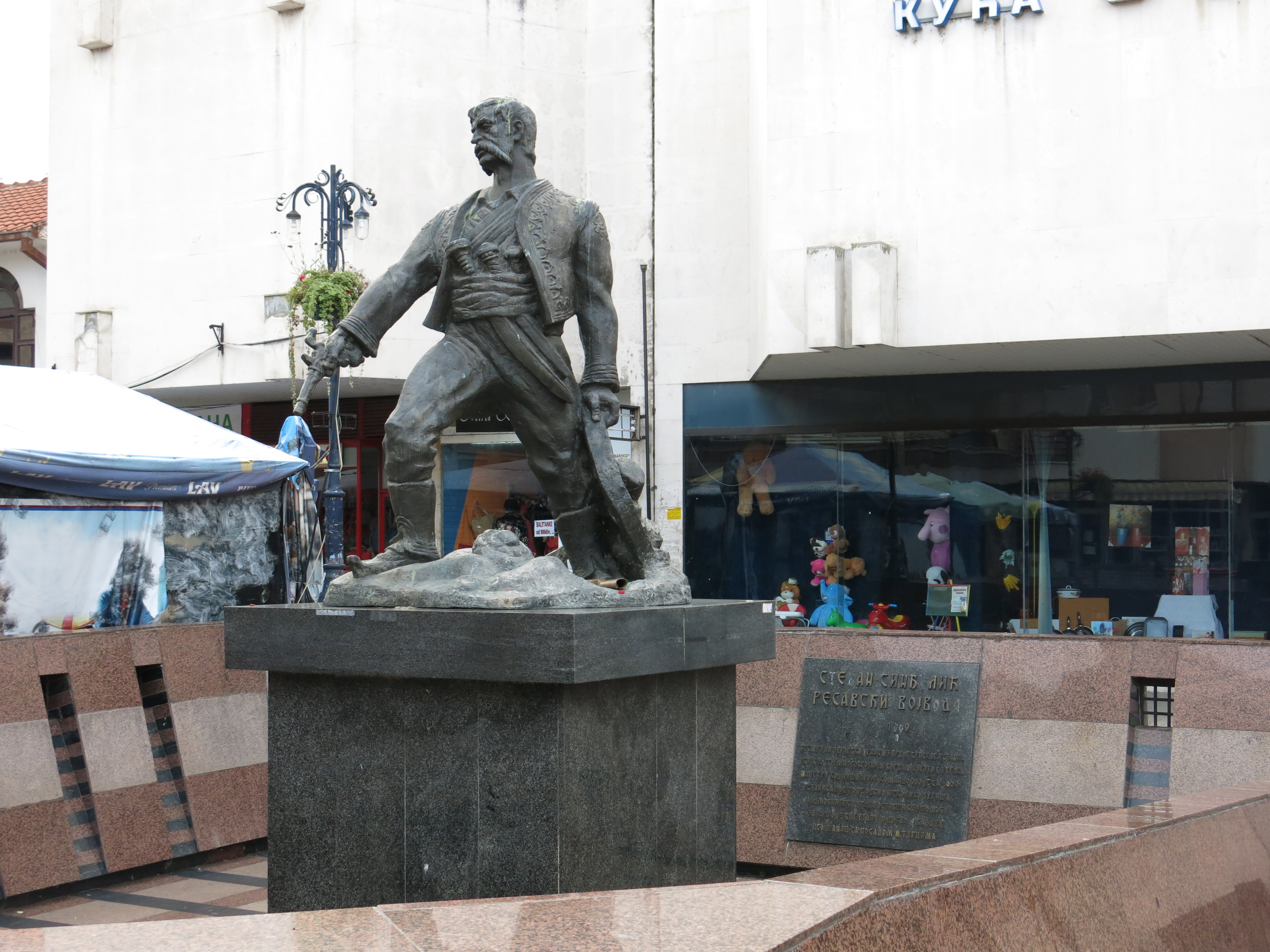
Monument to Stefan Sinđelić in Svilajnac.

== See also ==
- Skull Tower
- List of Serbian Revolutionaries

== Sources ==
- Bogićević, Mirko (1989). Stevan Sinđelić, resavski vojvoda, i njegovo doba. Vuk Karadžić. ISBN 978-86-307-0279-2.
- Milićević, Milan Đ. (1888). Поменик знаменитих људи у српског народа новијега доба. Издање Чупићеве задужбине – via Archive.org.
- Nenadović, Konstantin N. (1884). Живот и дела великог Ђорђа Петровића Кара-Ђорђа. Vol. II (1 ed.). Vienna: У Штампарији Јована Н. Вернаја. pp. 816–827 – via Google Books.
- Nikolić, Dejan (2000). "Стеван Синђелић". Srpske vojskovođe. Narodna biblioteka "Resavska škola". pp. 187–189.
- Milisavljević, Miloš (1954). "Устаничке биографије: Ђурица Сточић". In Perović, Radoslav (ed.). Прилози за историју првог српског устанка: необјављена грађа. Народна књига. pp. 39–42.
- Stojančević, Vladimir (1991). "Ћупријска нахија – Ресава у време Иванковачке битке 1805. године" (PDF). Balcanica. 22. Belgrade: SANU: 101–109.
