= Brestovo (Despotovac) =

Coordinates: 44.1167°N 21.3286°E

- Village
- Interactive map of Brestovo
- Country: Serbia
- Municipality: Despotovac
- Time zone: UTC+1 (CET)
  - Summer (DST): UTC+2 (CEST)

Brestovo (Serbian Cyrillic: Брестово) is a village situated in Despotovac municipality in Serbia.

In late 1803, Ćor-Milija, who lived in the village, joined the conspiration to overthrow the Dahije from the Sanjak of Smederevo. During the First Serbian Uprising (1804–13), he fought under the command of vojvoda Stevan Sinđelić, and was his advisor, and he was executed in Belgrade by Skopljak.

== Sources ==
- Stojančević, Vladimir (1991). "Ћупријска нахија – Ресава у време Иванковачке битке 1805. године" (PDF). Balcanica. 22. Belgrade: SANU: 101–109.
