= Milea River =

Milea River may refer to:

- Milei (river), also spelled Milea, a tributary of the Bâsca in Buzău County, Romania
- Milea, a tributary of the Siriul Mare in Buzău County, Romania

== See also ==
- Milea (disambiguation)
