= Staro Selo (Velika Plana) =

Staro Selo Старо Село
- Town
- Location within Serbia
- Coordinates: 44°17′37″N 21°05′41″E
- Country: Serbia
- District: Podunavlje District
- Municipality: Velika Plana

Population (2011)
  - Total: 2,733
- Time zone: UTC+1 (CET)
  - Summer (DST): UTC+2 (CEST)

Staro Selo, formerly Adžibegovac is a small town in the municipality of Velika Plana, Serbia. According to the 2002 census, the town has a population of 3022 people.

The village is the birth place of revolutionary Stojko Krivokuća.
