= Stenjevac =

Coordinates: 44°05′13″N 21°32′10″E

- Village
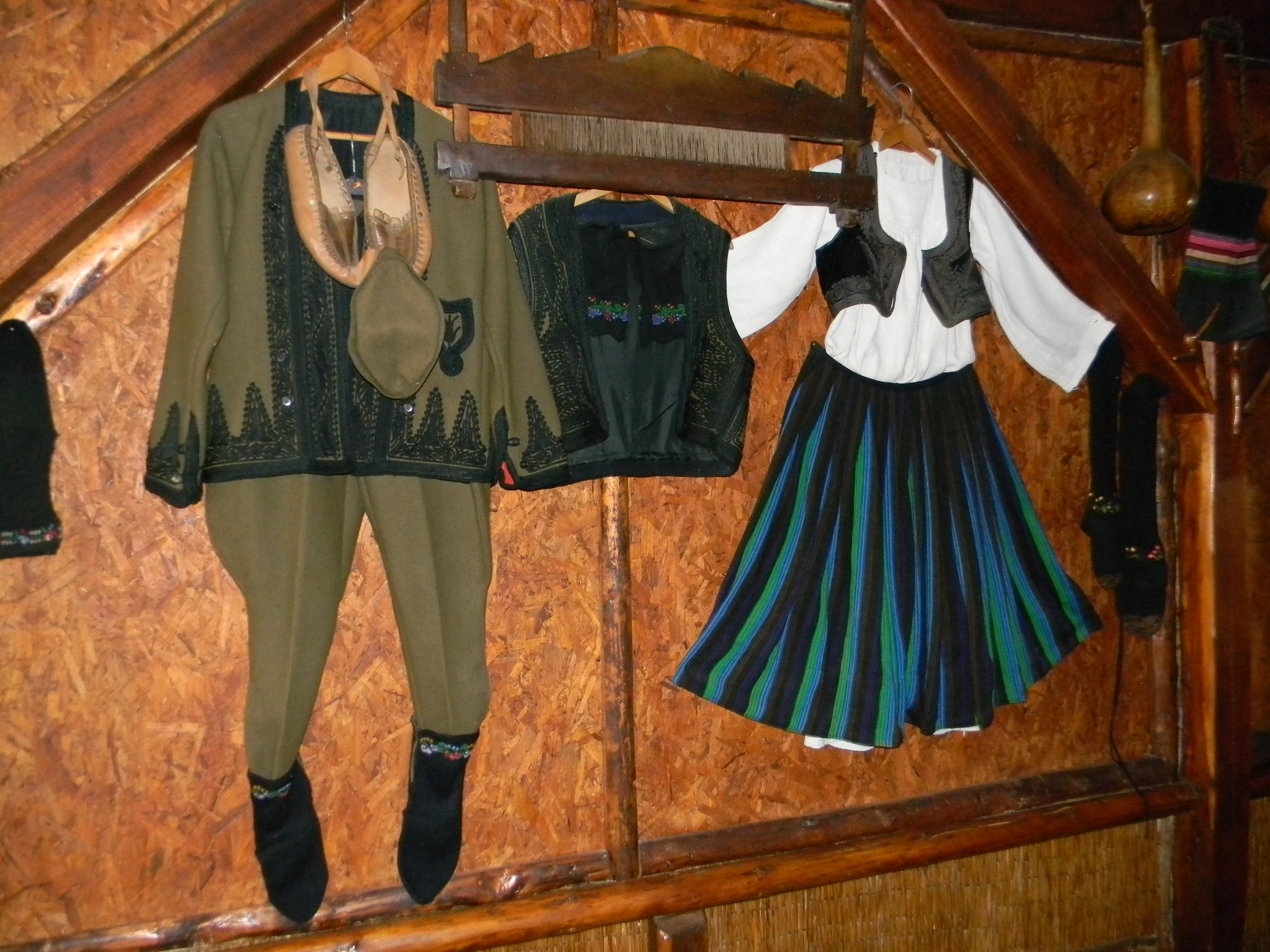
- Traditional costumes on display
- Interactive map of Stenjevac
- Country: Serbia
- Municipality: Despotovac

Government
- Time zone: UTC+1 (CET)
  - Summer (DST): UTC+2 (CEST)

Stenjevac (Serbian Cyrillic: Стењевац) is a village situated in Despotovac municipality in Serbia (Europe).

In late 1803, bimbaša Milovan Resavac, who was born in the village, joined the conspiration to overthrow the Dahije from the Sanjak of Smederevo. During the First Serbian Uprising (1804–13), he fought under the command of vojvoda Stevan Sinđelić and fell at Kamenica (31 May 1809).

== Sources ==
- Stojančević, Vladimir (1991). "Ћупријска нахија – Ресава у време Иванковачке битке 1805. године" (PDF). Balcanica. 22. Belgrade: SANU: 101–109.
