= Ivankovac =

- Village
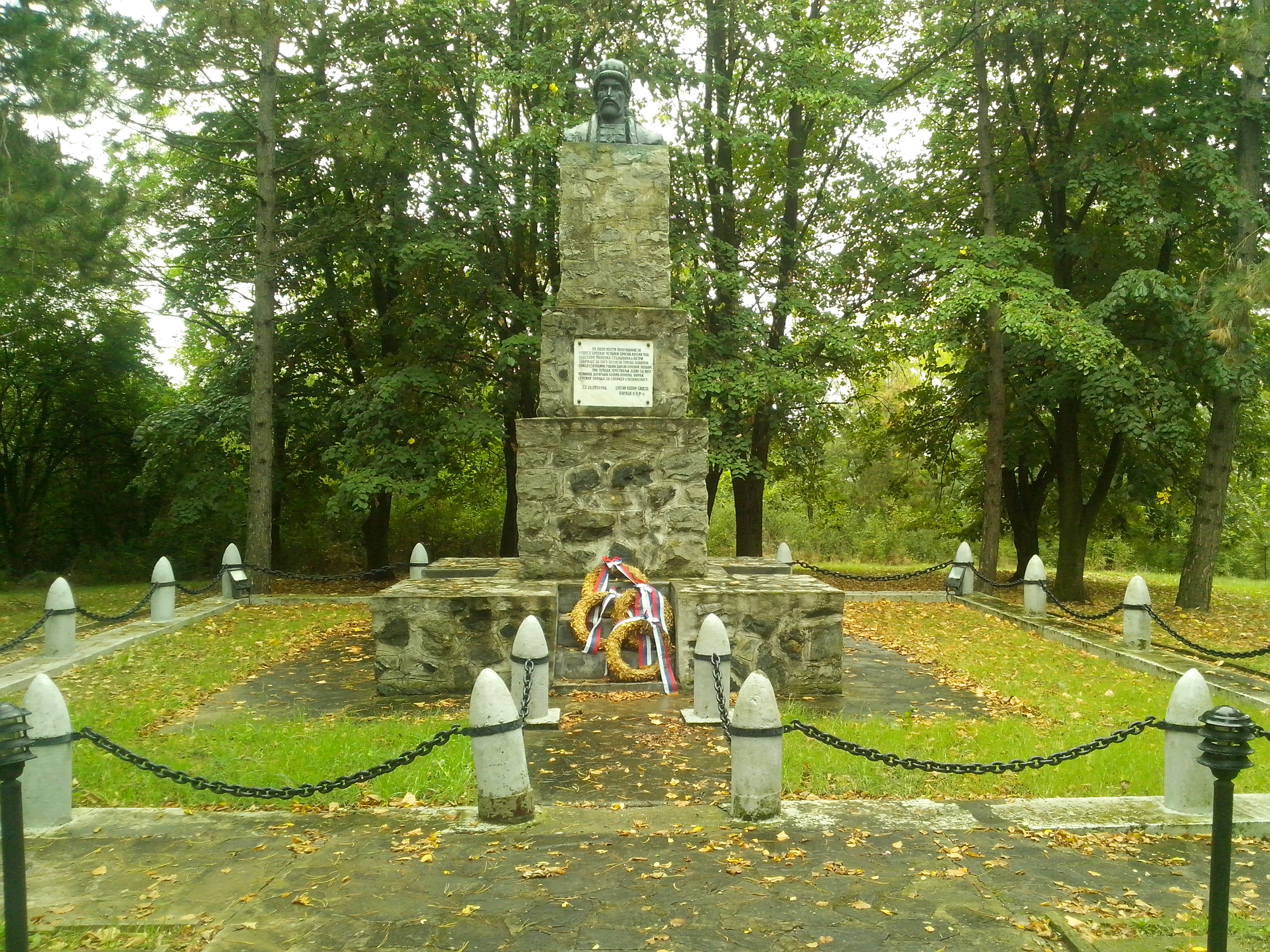
- Monument to the Battle of Ivankovic.
- Interactive map of Ivankovac
- Coordinates: 43.97335°N 21.43535°E
- Country: Serbia
- District: Pomoravlje District
- Municipality: Ćuprija
- Elevation: 551 ft (168 m)

Population (2002)
  - Total: 267
- Time zone: UTC+1 (CET)
  - Summer (DST): UTC+2 (CEST)

Ivankovac is a village in the municipality of Ćuprija, Serbia. According to the 2011 census, the village has a population of 219. It was the site of the Battle of Ivankovac.

== Climate ==
Ivankovac

Climate chart (precipitation, max. and min. temperature)
J	F	M	A	M	J	J	A	S	O	N	D
109 4 −7	91 7 −4	77 16 1	127 20 5	165 25 12	78 30 16	85 31 17	37 30 18	85 23 12	72 18 8	63 10 3	95 3 −4
- █ Average max. and min. temperatures in °C
- █ Precipitation totals in mm
Imperial conversion
J	F	M	A	M	J	J	A	S	O	N	D
4.3 39 19	3.6 45 25	3 61 34	5 68 41	6.5 77 54	3.1 86 61	3.3 88 63	1.5 86 64	3.3 73 54	2.8 64 46	2.5 50 37	3.7 37 25
- █ Average max. and min. temperatures in °F
- █ Precipitation totals in inches
