= Milosav Zdravković =

Serbian nobleman and revolutionary (1787–1854)

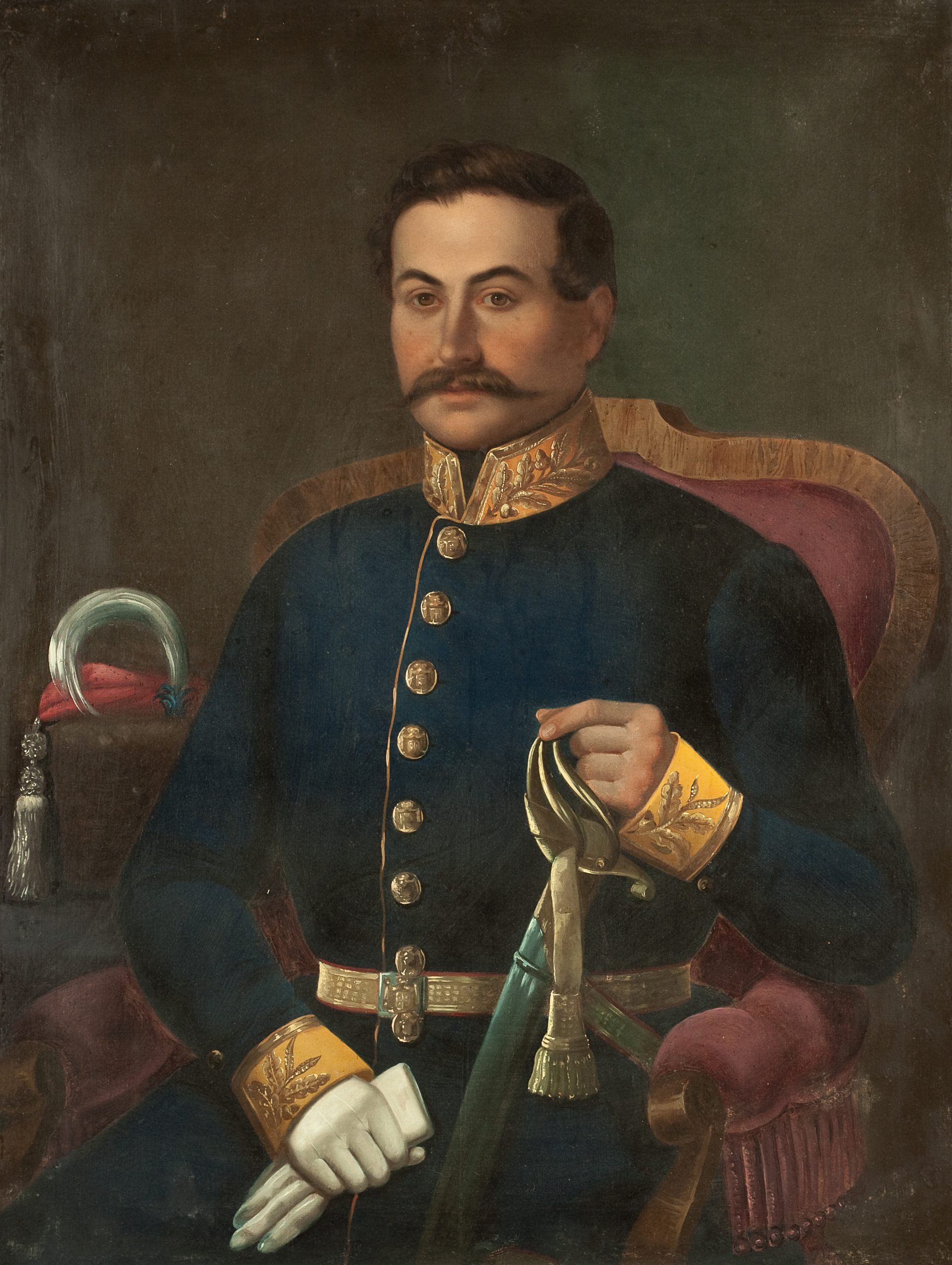
Portrait of Milosav Zdravković by Uroš Knežević, National Museum of Serbia

Milosav Zdravković-Resavac (Serbian Cyrillic: Милосав Здравковић-Ресавац; 1787 – 1854) was the Duke of Resava, a participant in the First Serbian Uprising and Second Serbian Uprising, a state official and a participant in many political events in the Principality of Serbia. He acquired the title of duke after taking part in the Battle of Čegar in 1809. He was eventually succeeded by his brother Dobrosav Zdravković who also became the district chief. Both Milosav and Dobrosav were sons of Milija Zdravković.

== Biography ==
Milosav Zdravković was the obor-knez of the Resava Principality of the Ćuprija Nahiya from 1809. Milosav was married to the daughter of the Duke of the Resava Principality of the Ćuprija Nahija (until 1809) Stevan Sinđelić. Duke Milosav Zdravković succeeded Duke Stevan Sinđelić, who died in the Battle of Čegar.

Unlike most other dukes, after the collapse of the First Serbian Uprising in 1813, he did not flee across the Sava and the Danube, but together with his father Milija surrendered to the Grand Vizier Hurshid Pasha. Hurshid Pasha did not want to execute them but in 1814, Ćaja-paša in his zeal had Milosav's father liquidated, and then impaled his head and placed it next to other heads of Serbian insurgents in front of the Belgrade's Stambol Gate. Due to his father's death, Milosav, with the support of Belgrade's Metropolitan Dionysius, fled from Belgrade to Resava, where he prepared for a new uprising in 1815. During the Second Serbian Uprising, together with the insurgents, he fought against the Turks in the battle of Ranovac, as well as during the Turkish attack on Miliva.

After the Second Serbian Uprising, Milosav was elected prince of the Ćuprija nahiya, and since no courts had yet been established in the Principality of Serbia between 1815 and 1825, Resavac was the executor of the lower judicial power in the nahiya. Despite the fact that he took part in almost every rebellion against Prince Miloš, Milosav was the prince of Nahiya, the people's judge and finally a member of the Governing State Council during Miloš's rule.

When Mihailo Obrenović came to power, Resavac sided with the leaders of the Constitutional Defender's Party and began to move the people of his region against the prince. After Prince Mihailo was overthrown in 1842, Alexander Karađorđević became the new ruler of the Principality of Serbia. During his reign, Milosav was a member of the Governing State Council until his retirement, and due to his talent for oratory, he gave speeches at court several times.

=== Life before joining the insurgents ===
The family of Milosav Zdravković-Resavac is from the village of Lomnica in Gornja Resava. Milosav Zdravković's father is Prince Milija Zdravković, a member of the Governing Council for the Ćuprija nahiya, a native of Lomnica, the Resava principality of the Ćuprija nahiya. Before Milosavlje's birth, Milija Zdravković left his birthplace and went with his family to the village of Brestovo, which today belongs to the Municipality of Despotovac and is almost equally distant from its municipal center, Despotovac, as well as from Svilajnac and Jagodina. Milosav Zdravković was born here in Brestovo around 1780. He started reading and writing very early. He acquired his first knowledge in the village of Ivankovac, near Ćuprija, and then with the Resava protege Miloje in Lomnica. Shortly after the outbreak of the First Serbian Uprising in 1804, Milija Zdravković became Karađorđe's advisor for the Ćuprija nahiya. When the Great School was opened in Belgrade in 1808, he enrolled his son Milosav. Thus, Milosav Zdravković, together with Karađorđev's son Aleks, Vuk Karadžić and fifteen other young men, became a student of the first generation of the French-modelled institution of higher learning in Belgrade called the Velika škola.

=== The first Serbian uprising ===
The Turkish offensive forced Milosav to return to Resava in 1809. Already that year, he fought on Čegra together with his Resavci. After that defeat and the death of Stevan Sindjelić, Karadjordje appointed him the new Duke of Resava. The collapse of the First Serbian Uprising in 1813 forced a large number of dukes to flee across the Sava and the Danube so that the Turks would not kill them. Milosav Zdravković did not want to flee, but he and his father Milija decided to surrender to the Grand Vizier Kurshid Pasha.

=== The period between the two uprisings ===
Kurshid-pasha did not want to execute either Milija or Milosav. Milosava gave it to the priest Dina Nishlija, who later became the Metropolitan of Belgrade, under the name of Dionysius. Since then, Milosav has been his scribe. During 1813, the Duke of Resava was personally convinced of Turkish cruelty. Executions of Serbs could be seen every day in Belgrade during 1813 and 1814, so that in the end the Hadži-Prodan revolt broke out, which was quelled, and the Turks continued with the executions. That year, Ćaja-paša had Milosav's father Milija liquidated in Belgrade, and then nailed his severed head to a stake and placed it, among other heads of Serbian insurgents, in front of the Stambol Gate. His father's death made Milosava think more and more about fleeing Belgrade. His protector at the time, Metropolitan Dionysius, supported him in that idea, so that Milosav, under the pretext of collecting a chimney for the metropolitan, fled to Resava in the spring of 1815, where he prepared for a new uprising in the same year.

=== Another Serbian uprising ===
Manasija Monastery, where the insurgents withdrew during the Turkish attack on Miliva.

The second Serbian uprising broke out in Cveta on April 23, 1815, after Sulejman-paša Skopljak committed great violence against the Serbian people. The Duke of Leskovac, Ilija Strelja, crossed into the Smederevo Nahija with a part of his students and raised the people of this area to arms. Then he continued his activity in Požarevac Nahija, together with Duke Pavle Cukić, and soon Milosav joined them with his Resavci. They quickly agreed to attack the Turks on Ranovac. The battle of Ranovac was devastating for the Turks. In this battle, Milosav showed great courage, thus justifying his title of Duke from the First Serbian Uprising. After this battle, Milosav and Pavle Cukić moved to the Resava area and headed to the village of Miliva near Despotovac. The two of them planned to establish a trench there in order to stop the Turks if they tried to pass through Ćuprija through Gornja Resava. What they feared soon happened. The Turkish army attacked the insurgents in Miliva. They retreated to the Manasija monastery, having nowhere to go. The Ottomans set fire to many houses in Miliva, and then returned to Ćuprija. After this event, Milosav and Pavle saw that the tactics of warfare had to change. So they decided to return to Milivo. They dug an even bigger trench and re-established themselves. A new Turkish attack met with fierce insurgent defences. The defeated Turks withdrew, leaving behind weapons, ammunition and equipment.

The Second Serbian Uprising ended with the Milos-Maraslija agreement.

== Politician ==
Respecting the merits of Milosav from the First and Second Serbian Uprising, the people of the Ćuprija Nahiya elected him their prince on August 24, 1815. A document on this has been preserved, which states:

To let every judge know, like us, the whole vilayet, we received Milosav Zdravković to be our court and the duke and the elder in the vilayet; to keep us as the father of his sons, not to be a stepfather but a father and the right to be guided by the commandments, first of all, the sovereign of God.

The wish of the people of the Ćuprija nahiya was confirmed by Prince Miloš Obrenović with his Charter on December 2, 1815, while giving Milosav permission to keep ten cops in order to maintain order in the nahiya. At the time of his performance of the function of the nahiya prince, Svilajnac developed rapidly. In 1818, Svilajnac had 96 households, and the following year 182 households, while in 1822 there were 214 households with 564 taxpayers. There was also the formation of the artisan and trade class, and thus the bazaar core, which spread the influence on the economic and social development of the whole of Resava.

As courts had not yet been established in the Principality of Serbia between 1815 and 1825, the Nahiya princes were the executors of lower judicial power. That is how Milosav Zdravković judged in many disputes between the citizens of Ćuprija nahiya. Whenever he was in doubt as to how to judge, he would ask for the advice of Prince Milos. Milosav conducted out-of-court adjudication of civil cases until the beginning of the work of the district court of the Ćuprija nahiya on January 1, 1825, with its seat in Svilajnac.

Although Prince Miloš Obrenović and Marashli Ali Pasha agreed to form a joint Serbian-Turkish administration, some spahis continued to act arbitrarily. They gathered a dozen spahis, but they did so quite unjustly, plundering as much as possible from the people. Milosav informed Prince Miloš about this on several occasions by letters. In one of them, among other things, he says:

We, the undersigned, humbly beg you and hand over the lawsuit, to do you a great favour and to report to the honourable vizier, for the sake of Vranjalija, Ibrahim Spahija, to lift him from here from Ćuprija ...

Thus, Prince Milosav later tried to regulate many Serbian-Turkish issues, relying on Milosev's diplomacy.

Resavac took part in almost every revolt against Prince Miloš, but at the same time, he worked for him, regularly informing him about everything. Ignoring his rebellion, it can be said that the relations between Milosav and Prince Milos were quite correct. According to Resava, Milosav, among other things, collected foxes, skunks and rabbit skins for him, which Milos needed for the Belgrade vizier. But despite their good relations, Milos often changed Milosav's duties, so that he was: a duke, a Nahija prince, a people's judge and finally a member of the State Council. Whenever the prince needed a loyal man, Milos Obrenovic counted on Milosav. At the end of 1823, Miloš founded the Great People's Court in Kragujevac, and soon the Belgrade Magistrate, whose president he first appointed Miloje Todorović, and then Milosav Zdravković. However, he remained in that position for only half a year, because in the fall of 1826, the prince reappointed him as a member of the Great People's Court in Kragujevac. Miloš did not keep him in this position for a long time, but on May 6, 1827, he appointed another Resavac, Pan Jeremić, in his place.

When the National Assembly adopted the Sretenje Constitution. In February 1835 in Kragujevac, Prince Miloš appointed members of the Governing State Council. Milosav Zdravković-Resavac also became one of the twelve advisors. Since problems arose around the Constitution at that time, the Sultan gave Serbia a new so-called Turkish Constitution in 1838. By the prince's order, in February 1839, his decree on the appointment of state advisers to the "Princely Serbian Council", out of a total of 17 members, was published. Even after the new appointment, Milosav was appointed state advisor.

=== After Miloš's abdication ===
Since he did not want to rule according to the Turkish constitution, Prince Miloš abdicated in 1839, leaving the throne to his son Milan Obrenović, who was on his deathbed. After Milan's death, the new prince of Serbia became Miloš's younger son Mihailo Obrenović, who immediately began to persecute many important Serbs. From that moment, Milosav Zdravković sided with the Constitutional People's Party and began to move the people of his region against Prince Mihailo. Thus, thanks to their common interest, Toma Vučić-Perišić became a close ally. A broad campaign against Prince Mihailo eventually yielded results. On 26 August 1842, Mihailo left Serbia and fled to Zemun. The new ruler of the Principality of Serbia became Karadjordje's son, Prince Alexander Karađorđević. During his reign, Milosav built a house in Belgrade, and became a member of the Governing State Council for several years.

After 1842, the people in the Principality of Serbia were divided into two factions, the Obrenovići and the Karađorđevići. The side of these others was held by an ombudsman who occupied the most important state functions in Belgrade. Milosav Zdravković stood by the leaders of the Constitutional Defender's Party, led by Toma Vučić-Perišić, Avram Petronijević, brothers Stojan and Aleksa Simić, Ilija Garašanin and others. When the news reached the ombudsman in 1843 that a revolt was being prepared in Smederevo and that there was a real possibility that Obrenović's emigration would enter Serbia, Toma Vučić-Perišić reacted quickly. Fearing that 2,000 policemen would not arrive in time from Smederevo from Kragujevac, where the headquarters of the ombudsman police were located, Toma ordered 300 infantrymen of the People's Army and 250 regular soldiers with two cannons to be sent there from Belgrade, as well as one captain with 200-strong cavalry. All of them were placed under the command of former Karadjordj's dukes, Milosav Resavac and Luka Lazarević. The revolt was soon quelled, but later there were conspiracies against Prince Aleksandar Karađorđević and his defenders of the Constitution. That same year, Milosav was elected a member of the Governor's Office of Princely Dignity together with Lazar Todorović and Stefan Stefanović, a position he held from 20 June to 27 June 1843.

== Wealth ==
Milosav had great wealth in his possession, which consisted of numerous meadows, forests, fields, watermills, shops, as well as a lot of money and gold coins. Despite the large property he owned, the people in Resava appreciated him. The people of Svilajnac then said that he gained everything he had with his work and in an honest way. Despite the fact that he spent the last years of his life in Belgrade, he often came to Svilajnac, where he had a house, known as Resavčev konak, with a large yard, in which there were several smaller houses. In the boarding house, where he also had servants, Resavac received guests, though most came to ask for help. He often gave money to the poor or helped them in other ways, which is why many in Svilajnac called him the "father of the poor". The building of his residence was later converted into a municipality. Municipal bodies were located in it until 1936. The residence was then demolished, and the old material was repurposed to build a new municipal building.

== Family and death ==
Milosav Zdravković was married twice. With his first wife, he had a son, Jovan, who died shortly after his father's death due to poor health. Jovan left behind three daughters: Katarina, Juca and Cana. Resavac's other wife's name was Stanija. She had two daughters with him: Mileva and Cana and a son named Jos. Resavac retired as a member of the Governing State Council. He died on 26 July 1854. He was buried in front of the gate of the church of St. Nicholas in Svilajnac.
