= Milia (disambiguation) =

Milia are small cysts that can appear just under the epidermis or on the roof of the mouth.

Milia may also refer to:

== People ==
- Matthew Milia (born 1985), American songwriter, musician, poet, and visual artist
- Milia Dayan (fl. 1870), Egyptian stage actress
- Milia Gataullina (born 1971), Russian graphic designer
- Milia Maroun (died 2026), Lebanese fashion designer

== Places ==
- El Milia District, Jilel province, Algeria
  - El Milia, a town and commune in the district
- Milia, Famagusta, a village in Famagusta District, Cyprus
- Milia, Paphos, a small village in Paphos District, Cyprus
- Milia, Evros, a village in Evros regional unit, Greece
- Milia, Pieria, a community in Katerini, Greece

== Other uses ==
- Milia Fallyna Jenius, a character from anime series The Super Dimension Fortress Macross

== See also ==
- Malia (disambiguation)
- Milea (disambiguation)
- Jamia Millia Islamia, a university in India
- Milija (name)
- George W. Milias (1925–1977), American politician
