= Stojko Krivokuća =

Serbian revolutionary

- Стојко Кривокућа
- Born: 17XX; Velika Plana area, Ottoman Empire
- Other names: Pavle, Todor (in Austrian documents)
- Military career
- Allegiance: Revolutionary Serbia (1804–?)
- Service years: 1804
- Unit: Resava army of Stevan Sinđelić
- Commands: Resava, Morava areas
- Conflicts: First Serbian Uprising (1804–13)

Stojko Krivokuća (Serbian: Стојко Кривокућа) was a Serbian revolutionary, a comrade of vojvoda Stevan Sinđelić.

== Early life ==
Krivokuća was from Adžibegovac (now Staro Selo) or Markovac in the Smederevo nahiya (now in the Velika Plana municipality). He was an associate of Karađorđe, and an important contact between the Resava nahiya and Šumadija in the 1803 conspiracy against the Dahije. With the outbreak of uprising, he joined the Resava army under Stevan Sinđelić. He was also known as Pavle and Todor in Austrian documents.

== Uprising ==
An Austrian report dated 20 March 1804 noted that "all Serbs took up weapons" and were holding the Morava towards Palanka, Jagodina and Rudnik, under the command of Karađorđe, Stevan Jakovljević, Stojko Krivokuća (named "Pavle") and Mladen Milovanović. The rebels fought in Batočina and Jagodina against Dahije leader Kučuk-Alija and his allies. According to an Austrian report, Krivokuća (named "Todor") had 800 men at Ćuprija who monitored the Morava and Constantinople Road.

There are accounts that 320 rebels in ambush attacked kırcalı leader Alija Gušanac, who had 800–900 men, at Duboki Potok by the Morava river near Ćuprija on 23 March [O.S. 11 March]. The Serb detachment included Stojko Krivokuća, Petar Dobrnjac, Paulj Matejić, Milovan from Radošin, Stevan Sinđelić and Milija Zdravković. The kırcalı had 80 killed, many wounded, and Gušanac's horse fell. In an epic poem of Sarajlija, there was an attack by rebels led by Stojko Krivokuća on Gušanac, and he connected it to Batočina. Gušanac was thwarted 2–3 times from breaking through to Belgrade.

The first fights with the Turks in the Resava area came near Jasenjar on the Svilajnac–Ćuprija road, where forces under the command of Milija Zdravković, Sinđelić and Krivokuća defeated them. The Ćuprija Turks had set out to attack Petar Dobrnjac who rose the Mlava and Požarevac Morava areas and Sinđelić had heard of this and intercepted them. They had many casualties and retreated to Ćuprija. The Turks, led by Gušanac, successfully attacked the Serbs at Grabovac, killing Krivokuća. According to M. Milićević, there were rumours that a Serbian musket killed him, unintentionally or as some vengeance.

The Resava rebels were sad about his death, and threw rocks into a pile to signify his place of death as a monument, and uttered "damned be he, who killed Krivokuća". The Grabovac locals remember him as "Milivoje Krivokuća".

== See also ==
- List of Serbian Revolutionaries

== Sources ==
- Bogićević, Mirko (1989). Stevan Sinđelić, resavski vojvoda, i njegovo doba. Vuk Karadžić. ISBN 978-86-307-0279-2.
- Đorđević, Miroslav R. (1967). Ослободилачки рат српских устанака, 1804-1806. Војноиздавачки завод. ISBN 978-86-335-0154-5.
- Jovanović, Dobrivoje (2014) [2009]. "ПРВЕ БОРБЕ СА ТУРЦИМА И ОСЛОБОЂЕЊЕ ЈАГОДИНЕ 1804.ГОДИНЕ" (PDF). Прошлост. 3. Историјски архив Јагодина.
- Jovanović, Dobrivoje (1994). "Јагодинска, Ћупријска и Параћинска нахија у првом српском устанку 1804-1813". Posebna izdanja. 15. Историјски архив Јагодина.
- Milićević, Milan Đ. (1888). Поменик знаменитих људи у српског народа новијега доба. Издање Чупићеве задужбине – via Archive.org.
- Milićević, Milan Đ. (1901). Додатак поменику од 1888. Знаменити људи у српскога народа који су преминули до краја 1900. г. Издање Чупићеве задужбине. pp. 179-.
- Nenadović, Konstantin N. (1884). Живот и дела великог Ђорђа Петровића Кара-Ђорђа. Vol. II (1 ed.). Vienna: У Штампарији Јована Н. Вернаја. pp. 816–827 – via Google Books.
- Novaković, Stojan (1904). Устанак на дахије 1804. Штампано у Државној штампарији – via Archive.org.
- Stojančević, Vladimir (1991). "Ћупријска нахија – Ресава у време Иванковачке битке 1805. године" (PDF). Balcanica. 22. Belgrade: SANU: 101–109.
