= Milijana Sakić =

Serbian politician

Milijana Sakić (Serbian Cyrillic: Милијана Сакић; born 1988) is a politician in Serbia. She was elected to the National Assembly of Serbia in the 2020 parliamentary election as a member of the Serbian Progressive Party.

== Private career ==
Sakić holds a degree in Serbian language and literature from the University of Novi Sad. She teaches at the technical school in Loznica.

== Politician ==
=== Municipal politics ===
Sakić received the thirtieth position on the Progressive Party's electoral list for the Loznica city assembly in the 2016 Serbian local elections and was elected when the list won a majority victory with thirty-four mandates. She did not seek re-election at the local level in 2020.

=== Member of the National Assembly ===
Sakić received the 116th position on the Progressive Party's Aleksandar Vučić — For Our Children list in the 2020 parliamentary election and was elected when the list won a landslide majority with 188 mandates. She is now a member of the committee on the rights of the child and the committee on education, science, technological development, and the information society; a deputy member of the health and family committee; a member of Serbia's delegation to the Parliamentary Assembly of the Francophonie (where Serbia has observer status); and a member of Serbia's parliamentary friendship groups with France, Japan, Portugal, Russia, Spain, and Switzerland.
