= Čegar =

Monument in Kamenica, Serbia

Coordinates: 43°21′56″N 21°56′54″E

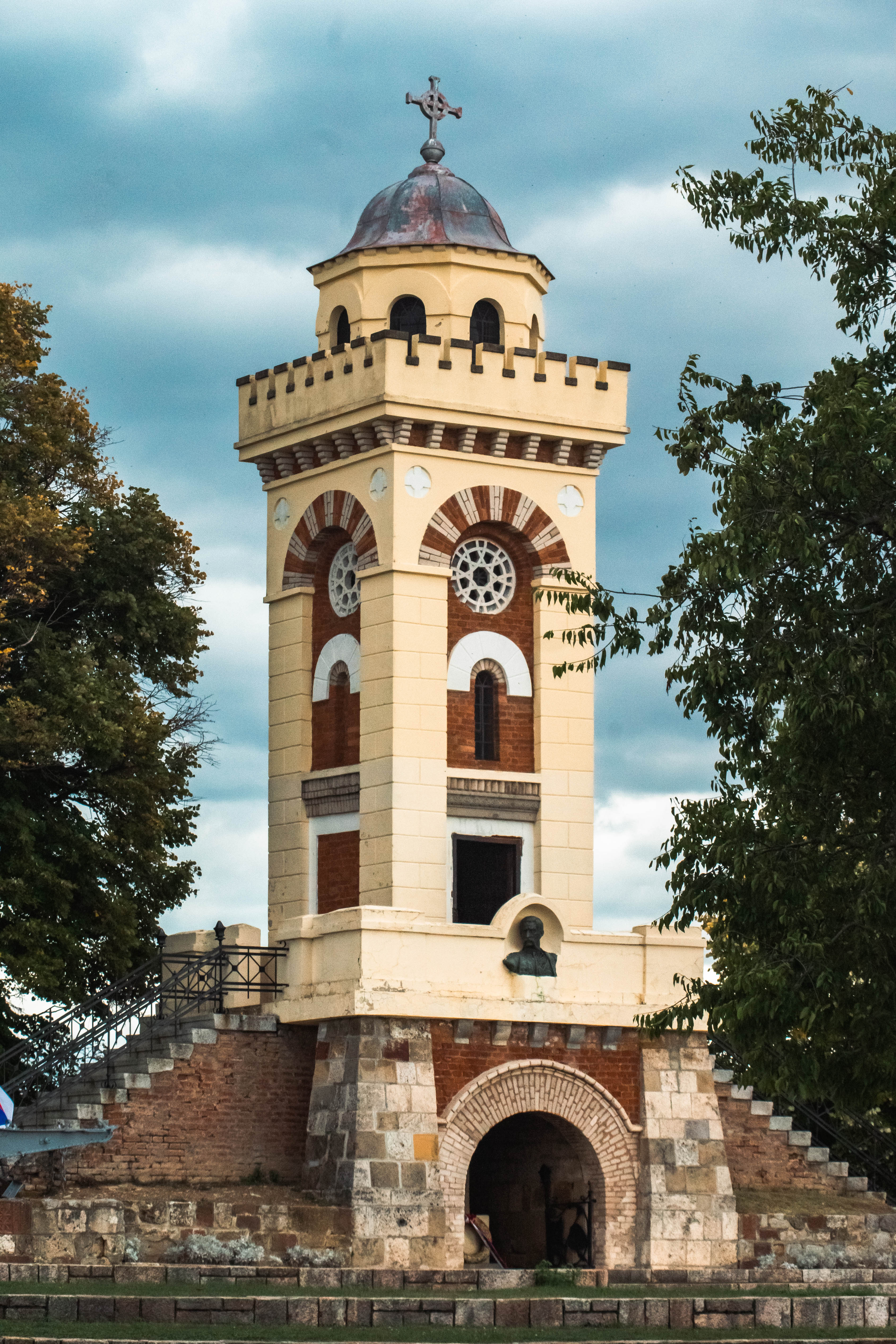
Čegar monument

Čegar (Serbian Cyrillic: Чегар) is a location in Serbia where the Battle of Čegar Hill took place. It was first marked on July 4, 1878 with the following inscription:

"To voivoda Stevan Sinđelić and his undying heroes who lost their lives on May 19, 1809, in their attack on Niš. Knez Milan M. Obrenović IV and his brave soldiers redeemed them on December 27, 1877 by conquering Niš."

Today's monument in the shape of a tower - a symbol of the soldiers' fortification - was erected for the fiftieth anniversary of the liberation of Niš from the Turks, on June 1, 1927. In 1938 a bronze bust of Stevan Sinđelić was positioned in the semicircular niche of the monument.

== Gallery ==
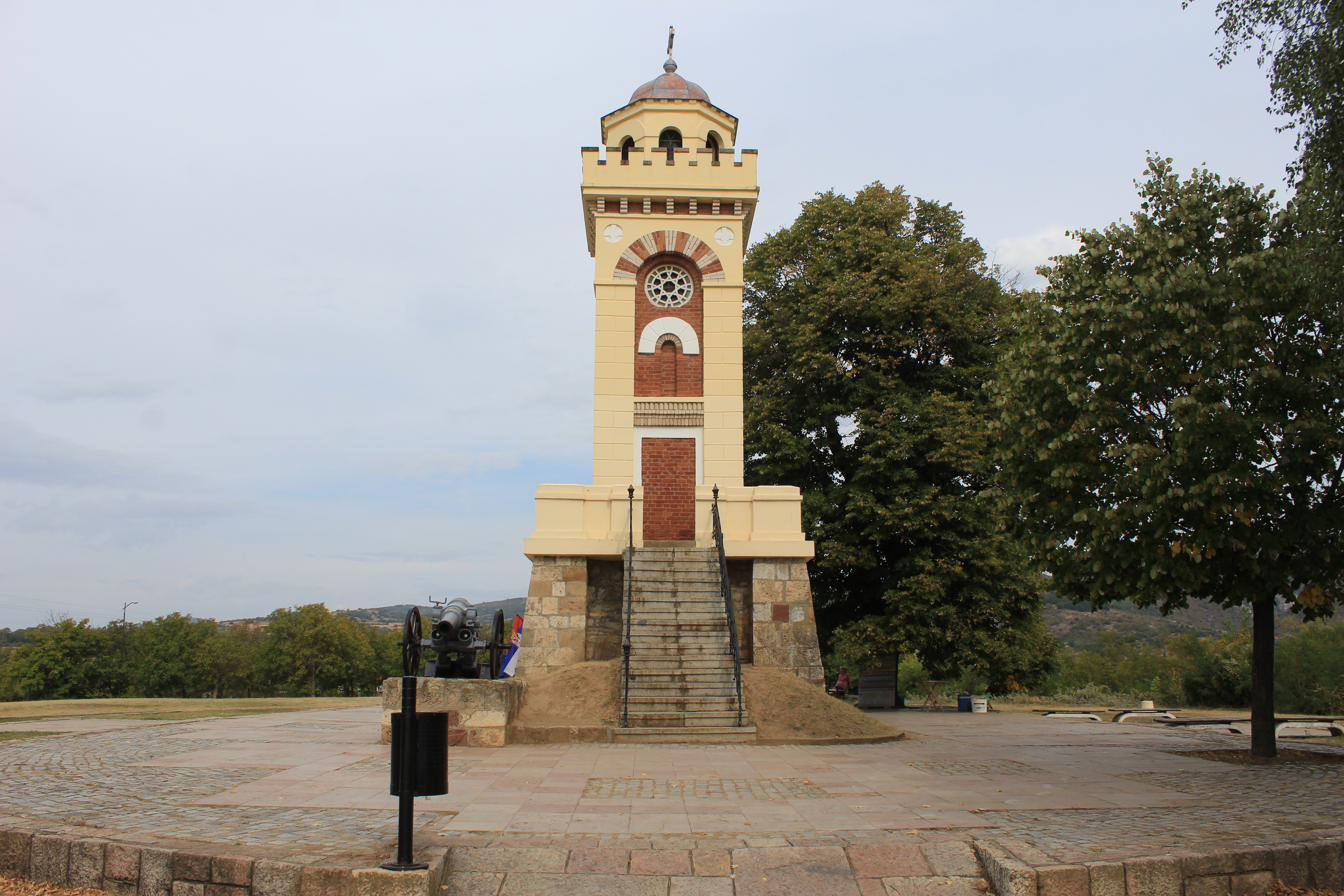

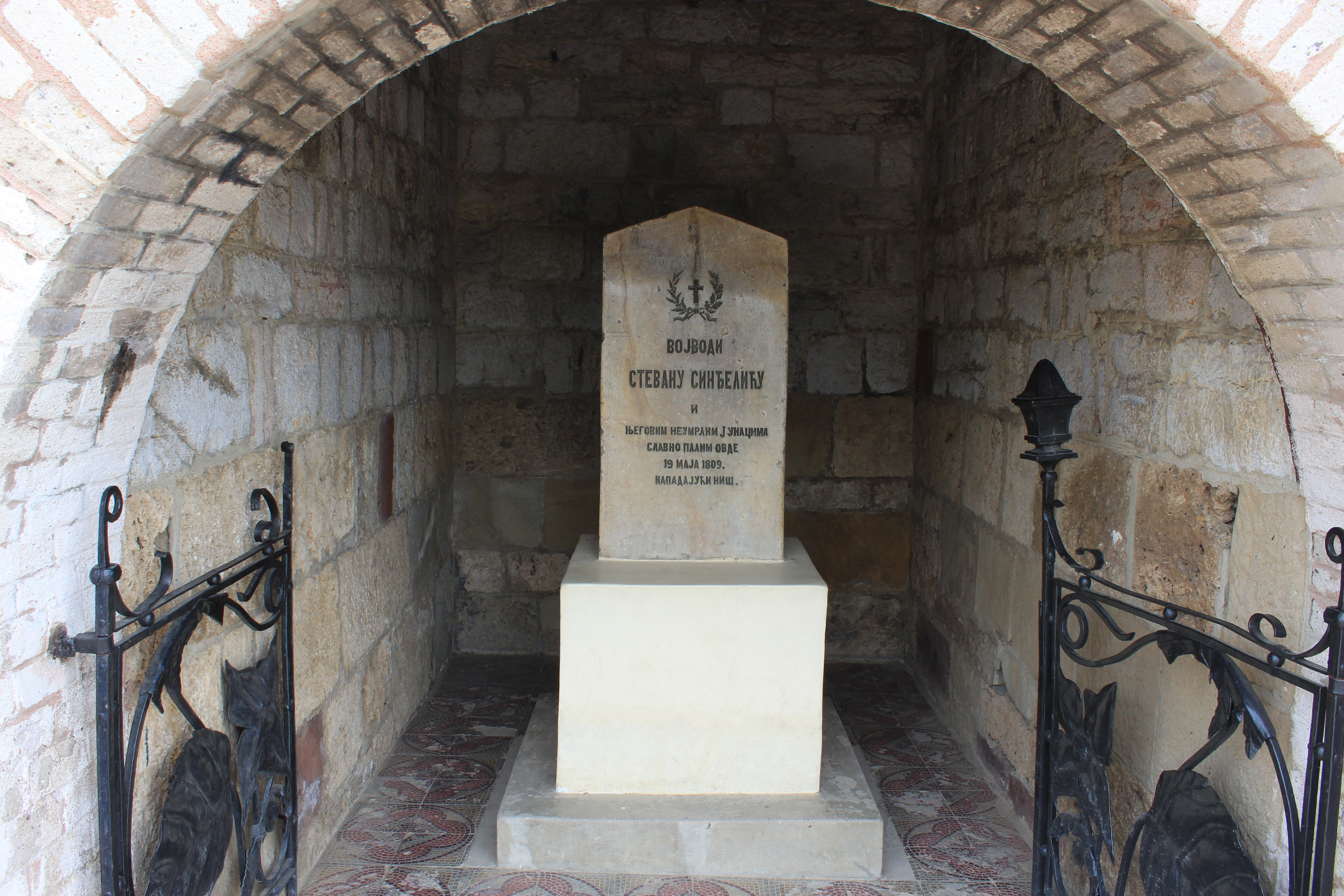

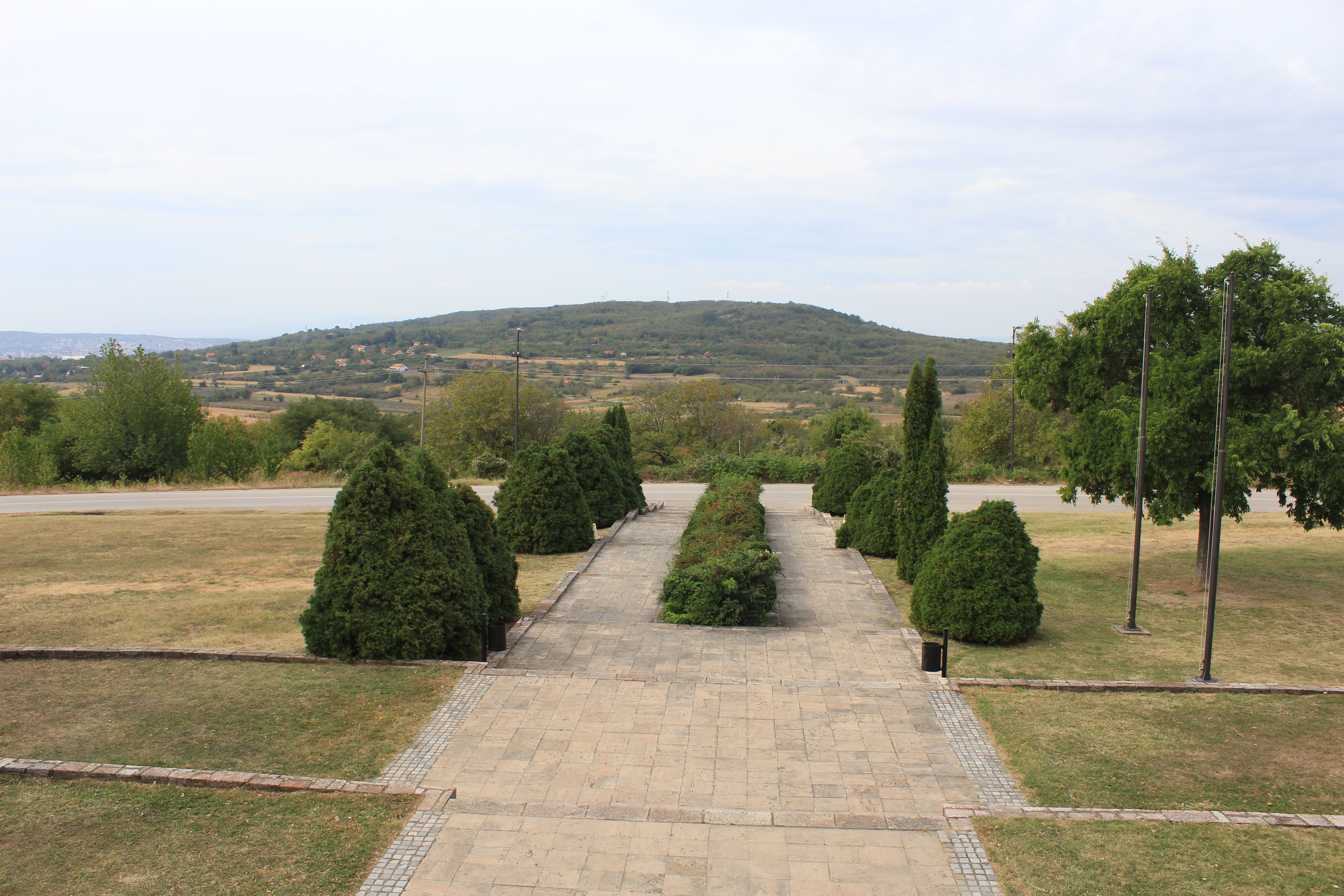

== See also ==
- First Serbian Uprising
- Skull Tower
- Tourism in Serbia
- Historic Landmarks of Exceptional Importance
