= Milea =

Milea (Greek: Μηλέα) may refer to:

== People ==
- Ada Milea (born 1975), Romanian singer and actress
- Ciprian Milea (born 1984), Romanian footballer
- Teo Milea (born 1982), Romanian pianist and composer
- Vasile Milea (1927–1989), Romanian politician, general and Nicolae Ceaușescu's Minister of Defence

== Villages in Greece ==
- Milea, in Aetolia-Acarnania, part of the municipal unit Inachos
- Milea, in Aetolia-Acarnania, part of the municipal unit Pyllini
- Milea, in Arcadia, part of the municipal unit Mantineia
- Milea, in Arta regional unit, part of the municipal unit Agnanta
- Milea, in Arta regional unit, part of the municipal unit Tetrafylia
- Milea, Evros, in Evros regional unit, part of the municipal unit Trigono
- Milea, in Evrytania, part of the municipality Karpenisi
- Milea, Grevena, in Grevena regional unit, part of the municipal unit Irakleotes
- Milea, Ioannina, a community in Ioannina regional unit
- Milea, Larissa, in Larissa regional unit, part of the municipal unit Sarantaporo
- Milea, Messenia, in Messenia, part of the municipal unit Lefktro
- Milea, Pella, in Pella regional unit, part of the municipal unit Exaplatanos
- Milea, Phocis, in Phocis, part of the municipal unit Tolofon
- Milea, Thesprotia, in Thesprotia, part of the municipal unit Filiates
- Milea, in Trikala regional unit, part of the municipal unit Aspropotamos

== Rivers ==
- Milei (river), a tributary of the Bâsca in Buzău County, Romania
- Milea, a tributary of the Siriul Mare in Buzău County, Romania

== Other uses ==
- Milea (film), a 2020 Indonesian film, based on the novel of the same name by Pidi Baiq

== See also ==
- Melia (disambiguation)
- Milia (disambiguation)
