= Nedeljko Radosavljević =

Serbian historian (born 1965)

Nedeljko Radosavljević (Serbian Cyrillic: Недељко Радосављевић; born 1965) is a Serbian historian and regular contributor to the Historical Institute in Belgrade. Graduated from the Department of History at the Faculty of Philosophy in Belgrade with the work Foreign policy of Serbia during the reign of Milan Obrenović in 1993. M. A. thesis: Archbishopric of Užice and Valjevo 1739–1804, 1999. Ph.D. thesis: Church in the Pashaluk of Belgrade under the authority of the Ecumenical Patriarchate between the years of 1766 to 1831 at the Faculty of Philosophy in Banja Luka, 2004. Worked as an archivist in Historical Archives of Valjevo, at the Faculty of Philosophy in Srpsko Sarajevo, Museum "Sirogojno", Faculty of Philosophy in Niš. Working in the Institute of History since 2001. As a scholarship-holder of the Ministry of Science and Environmental Protection of the Republic of Serbia he was pursuing his postdoctoral studies at the Institute of History of the Bulgarian Academy of Sciences in Sofia from June to December 2006. He is an associate member of the Matica srpska in Novi Sad, associate on the compilation of the Serbian biographical dictionary of Matica srpska as well as of the Biographical lexicon of the Valjevo region.

Field of Research: History of the Serbian Orthodox Church from the 15th to the 19thcenturies; social history of Serbian village and rural population in the 18th and the 19th centuries.

Languages: Russian, German, Bulgarian, Italian.

== Main works ==
- Радосављевић, Недељко В. (2000). Ужичко-ваљевска митрополија 1739-1804 [Užice-Valjevo Metropolitan Residence from 1739. to 1804.] (in Serbian). Ваљево: Историјски архив. ISBN 9788680613031.
- Радосављевић, Недељко В. (2007). Православна црква у Београдском пашалуку 1766-1831: Управа Васељенске патријаршије [The Orthodox Church in the Belgrade Pashaluk, 1766-1831: The Administration of the Universal Patriarchy] (in Serbian). Београд: Историјски институт САНУ. ISBN 9788677430658.
- Радосављевић, Недељко В. (2007). Грађа за историју Сарајевске (Дабробосанске) митрополије 1836-1878 [Sources for the History of Sarajevo (Dabrobosanska) Archdiocese, 1836-1878] (in Serbian). Београд: Историјски институт САНУ. ISBN 9788677430610.
- Радосављевић, Недељко В. (2008). "Херцеговачки митрополити 1766—1878" [Herzegovina Metropolitans, 1766-1878] (PDF). Историјски часопис (in Serbian). 57: 175–196. Archived from the original (PDF) on 2018-11-20.
- Радосављевић, Недељко В. (2009). Шест портрета православних митрополита 1766-1891 [Portraits of Six Orthodox Mitropolitans 1766-1891] (in Serbian). Београд: Историјски институт САНУ. ISBN 9788677430788.
- Radosavljević, Nedeljko V. (2010). "The Serbian Revolution and the Creation of the Modern State: The Beginning of Geopolitical Changes in the Balkan Peninsula in the 19th Century". Empires and Peninsulas: Southeastern Europe between Karlowitz and the Peace of Adrianople, 1699–1829. Berlin: LIT Verlag. pp. 171–178. ISBN 9783643106117.
- Радосављевић, Недељко В. (2011). "Дабробосанска (Сарајевска) митрополија у ратном периоду Српске револуције (1804-1815)" [Dabar-Bosnia (Sarajevo) Metropolis in the War Period of Serbian Revolution (1804-1815)]. Истраживања (in Serbian). 22. Филозофски факултет у Новом Саду: 205–219.
- Радосављевић, Недељко В. (2012). "Јоаникије, митрополит рашко-призренски" [Joanikije, Metropolitan of the Raško-Prizrenska Metropolis] (PDF). Историјски часопис (in Serbian). 61: 145–163. Archived from the original (PDF) on 2018-03-24.
- Радосављевић, Недељко В. (2013). "Митрополити бугарског порекла у православним епархијама у Босни и Херцеговини (1766-1880)" [The Bulgarian Origin Metropolitans in the Bosnia and Herzegovina Orthodox Eparchies (1766–1880)] (PDF). Српске студије (in Serbian). 4: 39–59. Archived from the original (PDF) on 2019-01-25.
- Радосављевић, Недељко В. (2013). "Викарни епископи Дабробосанске митрополије (1766-1878)" [Vicary Bishops of the Metropolis of Dabro-Bosnia (1766-1878)] (PDF). Историјски часопис (in Serbian). 62: 161–192. Archived from the original (PDF) on 2018-03-24.
- Радосављевић, Недељко В. (2013). "Авксентије III Петров Чешмеџијев, херцеговачки митрополит" [Avksentije III Petrov Češmedžijev, Metropolitan of Herzegovina]. Истраживања (in Serbian). 24. Филозофски факултет у Новом Саду: 267–284.
- Радосављевић, Недељко В. (2014). "Аутономија Православне цркве у Кнежевини Србији и арондација епископија 1831-1836" [Autonomy of the Orthodox Church in the Principality of Serbia and the Arondation of the Episcopacies (1831-1836)]. Истраживања (in Serbian). 25. Филозофски факултет у Новом Саду: 233–248.
- Радосављевић, Недељко В. (2014). "Кирил Живковић, епископ пакрачко-славонски (прилози за биографију)" [Kiril Živković, Bishop of Pakrac-Slavonia Diocese: Enclosures for Biography] (PDF). Историјски часопис (in Serbian). 63: 59–76. Archived from the original (PDF) on 2018-03-24.
- Радосављевић, Недељко В. (2015). "Данило, митрополит ужичко ваљевски и трновски" [Danilo, the Metropolitan of Užice, Valjevo and Trnovo] (PDF). Српске студије (in Serbian). 6: 145–162. Archived from the original (PDF) on 2019-02-14.
- Радосављевић, Недељко В. (2016). "Мостарска црквено-школска општина и промене на херцеговачком митрополијском трону (1888–1889)" [Church-School Municipality in Mostar and Changes on the Herzegovina Metropolitan Throne (1888–1889)] (PDF). Историјски часопис (in Serbian). 65: 307–330. Archived from the original (PDF) on 2018-03-24.
- Радосављевић, Недељко В. (2016). "Српска револуција и црквено питање 1804-1825" [Serbian Revolution and Church Issue 1804-1825]. Српска револуција и обнова државности Србије: Двеста година од Другог српског устанка [Serbian Revolution and Renewal of Serbian Statehood: Two Hundred Years since the Second Serbian Uprising] (in Serbian). Београд: Историјски институт САНУ. pp. 19–35. ISBN 9788677431167.
- Радосављевић, Недељко В. (2017). "Антим, епископ врачански, ловечки и митрополит београдски" [Anthimos, the Bishop of Vratsa and Lovech and Metropolitan of Belgrade] (PDF). Црквене студије (in Serbian). 14: 299–315. Archived from the original (PDF) on 2018-11-30.
- Радосављевић, Недељко В. (2018). "Српска православна црквеношколска општина у Мостару" [Serbian Orthodox Church-Educational Municipality in Mostar]. Глас САНУ (in Serbian). 428 (18): 329–350.
