= Milia Gataullina =

Russian painter

- Born: Mileysha Ravilevna GATAULLINA; November 22, 1971 (age 54); Ufa, Russia
- Known for: Graphic arts, Painting

Milia Gataullina (Russian: Миля Гатауллина; born November 22, 1971) is a contemporary Russian graphic artist and painter. She is a member of the Moscow Academy of Artists since 2002 and of the Russian Academy of Artists since 1998.

== Biography ==
Milia Gataullina was born in Ufa, Bashkortostan, Russia, on November 22, 1971. From 1982 to 1986 she attended Art School Number 2 in Ufa. From 1986 to 1990 she studied at Tomsky Lycee, a branch of the Moscow State Academic Arts Institute named Surikov. From 1990 to 1998 she studied at the Moscow State Academic Arts Institute named Surikov, in the section of graphic arts under B.A. Uspenskiy and A.B. Yakushin. From 1998 to 2001 she was part of the Creative Workshop of the Russian Academy of Artists, in the Graphics Workshop directed by A.D. Smarinova.

== Exhibits and awards ==
In 1993, one of her oil paintings, Blue Shadows, was auctioned at the Hotel Drouot auction house in Paris. It sold for the highest sum for a work of contemporary Russian applied art in that auction.

In 2006 she received the gold medal of the Russian Academy of Arts for her series of paintings and graphics titled "My Bashkirya.", based on themes of her native region in Russia.

In 2007 she received the silver medal of the Union of Artists of Russia for her graphics.

She held personal exhibits of her work at the Aksakova Museum in Ufa (2004); the Museum of Contemporary Art of the City of Moscow (2005), and the Exhibition Hall of the Moscow Union of Artists (2009).

Her work is found in the collections of the Museum of Contemporary Art of the City of Moscow and in the Nesterov State Art Museum in Ufa.

In 2010, she participated in a group exhibit in the residence of the British Ambassador in Moscow.

== Bibliography ==
- Aksenova, Natalia, Milia Gataullina, Beliy Gorod Publishing House, Moscow, 2008 (ISBN 978-5-7793-1562-3)
