= Milijana Maganjić =

Croatian basketball player

Personal information
- Born: 21 February 1981 (age 45) Livno, SFR Yugoslavia
- Listed height: 1.91 m (6 ft 3 in)
- Position: Center

Career history
- 1997–2002: Montmontaža Zagreb
- 2002–2003: Livno
- 2003–2005: Univerziteti Priština
- 2005–2006: Marburg
- 2006–2008: Merkur Celje
- 2008–: ESB Lille Metropole
- Rennes

Milijana Maganjić, married Evtoukhovich, (born 21 February 1981 in Livno, SFR Yugoslavia) is a Croatian female basketball player.
