= Battle of Ivankovac =

1805 battle during the First Serbian Uprising

Coordinates: 43°58′25″N 21°26′05″E

- Part of the First Serbian Uprising
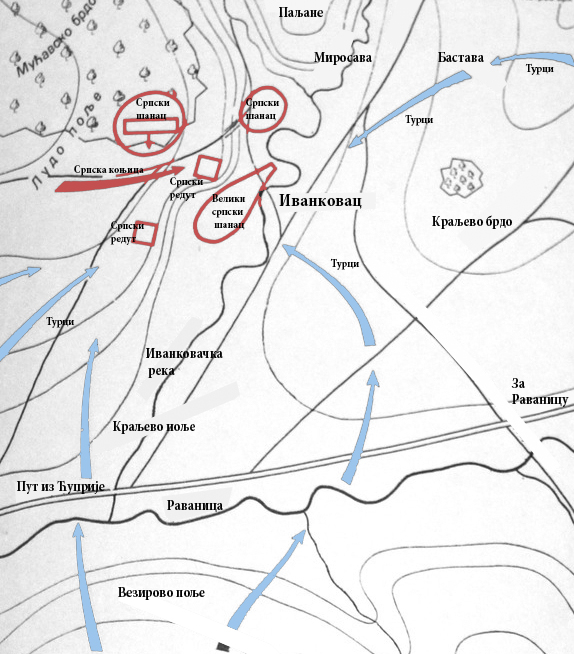
- Map of the battlefield
Date	18 August [O.S. 6 August] 1805
Location	Ivankovac, Sanjak of Smederevo, Ottoman Empire (today Serbia)
Result	Serbian victory

Belligerents
Revolutionary Serbia	Ottoman Empire

Commanders and leaders
(Revolutionary Serbia) Milenko Stojković; (Revolutionary Serbia) Karađorđe Petrović	(Ottoman Empire) Hafiz Mustafa Pasha †

Units involved
Požarevac nahija Resava nahija	Ottoman Army (Sanjak of Niš muster)

Strength
2,500 men (initially); 7,500 men (reinforced)	20,000 men

Casualties and losses
~ 1,000	c. 10,000

The Battle of Ivankovac (Serbian: Бој на Иванковцу, romanized: Boj na Ivankovcu) was the first full-scale confrontation between Serbian revolutionaries and the regular forces of the Ottoman Empire during the First Serbian Uprising.

In the summer of 1805, Hafiz Mustafa Agha, known in historiography as "Hafiz Pasha", gathered an army in the Sanjak of Niš to crush the Serbian rebels led by Milenko Stojković near the village of Ivankovac. The battle ended with a Serbian victory and the death of the pasha, prompting Ottoman Sultan Selim III to declare jihad (holy war) against the Serbs.

== Background ==
In the 1790s, the Ottoman Sultan Selim III granted the Serbs in the Sanjak of Smederevo (central Serbia) the right to run their own affairs in exchange for their cooperation with the governor of Belgrade, Hadži Mustafa Pasha. Following the Slaughter of the Knezes in February 1804, a revolt led by Karađorđe Petrović erupted against the Ottoman janissary junta (the "Dahije") in Serbia. The Serbs initially received the support of Selim and managed to defeat the corrupt janissaries by the end of the year. In the negotiations that followed the Serbs demanded the restoration of their autonomy while making contact with other Serbs in other parts of the Ottoman Empire. Alarmed by the Serbs demands and actions, Selim appointed the Ottoman governor of Niš, Hafiz Pasha, as the new governor of Belgrade and ordered him to destroy the Serbian insurgents. For the first time a regular Ottoman force was sent to crush the rebels.

== Battle ==
During the Summer the Ottoman force arriving from Niš and led by Hafiz Pasha was ambushed by a much smaller Serbian force commanded by Milenko Stojković at the village of Ivankovac near Ćuprija. On 18 August [O.S. 6 August] 1805. Stojković designed fortifications consisting of three earth and palisade fortresses and two redoubts. Serbian leader Karađorđe arrived with guns and reinforcements defeating and driving the Turks back to Niš, where Hafiz Pasha, seriously wounded during the battle, died as a result.

== Aftermath ==
The battle was a major victory for the Serbian rebels. It marked the first time that a regular Ottoman Turkish unit was defeated by Serbian revolutionaries during the First Serbian Uprising. The victory meant that the Serbian forces had taken full control of the Belgrade Pashaluk. Smederevo was captured in November and became the first capital of the Serbian revolutionary government, while Belgrade was taken the following year. Defeat in the battle prompted Selim to declare jihad (holy war) against the Serbian revolutionaries fighting to expel the Turks from Serbia.

== Gallery ==
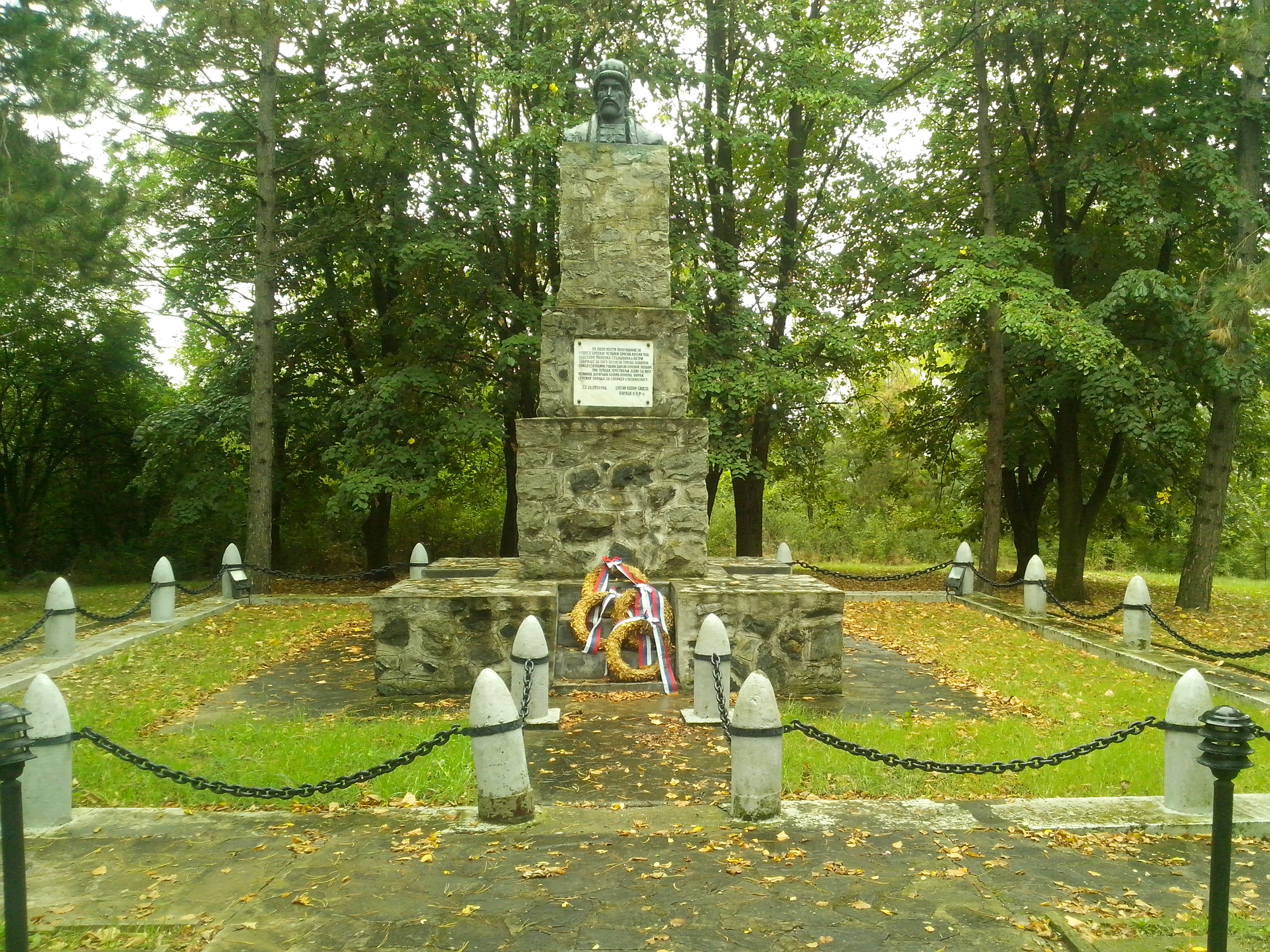
Monument in Ivankovac.

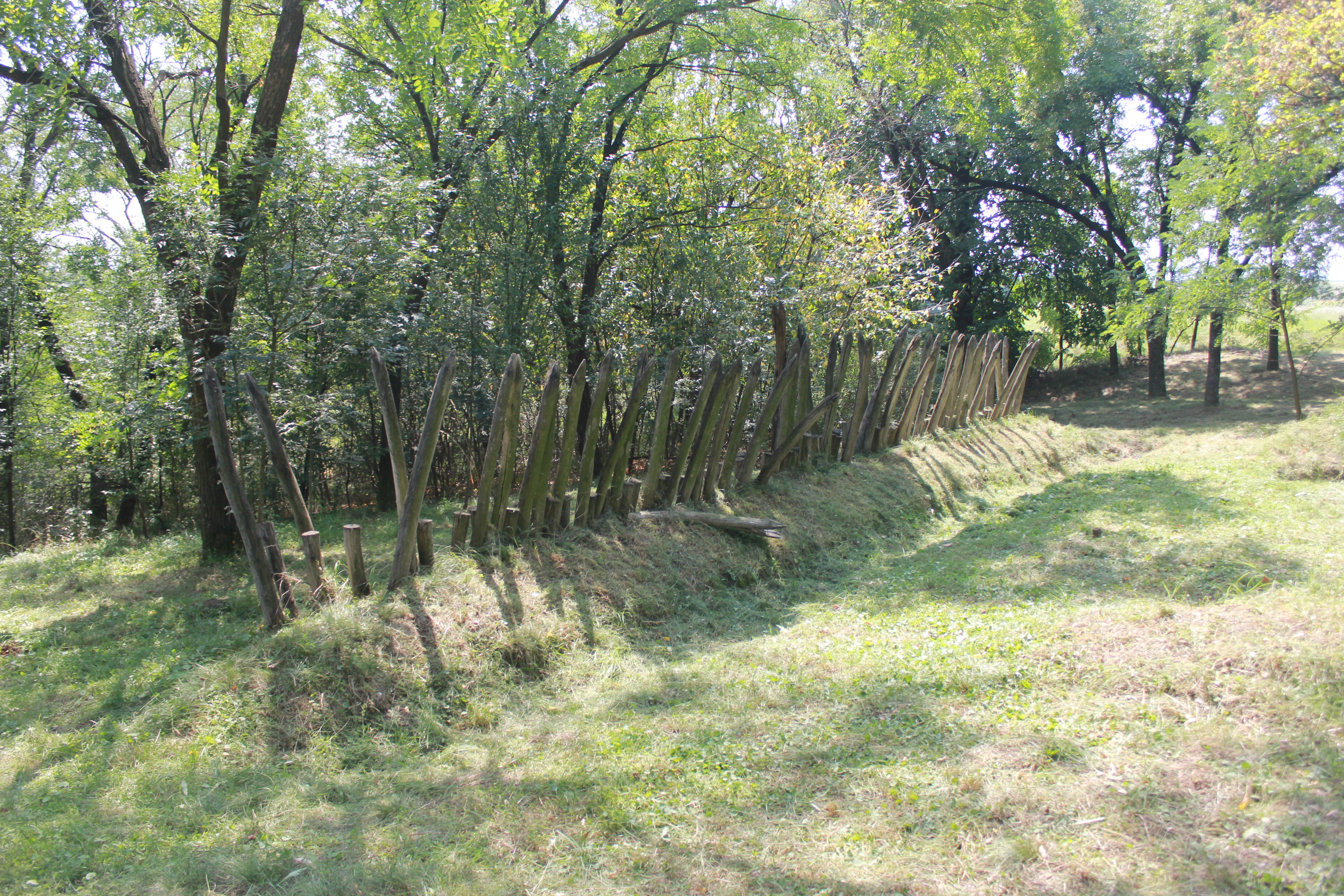
Remains of sconces of the battle of Ivankovac.

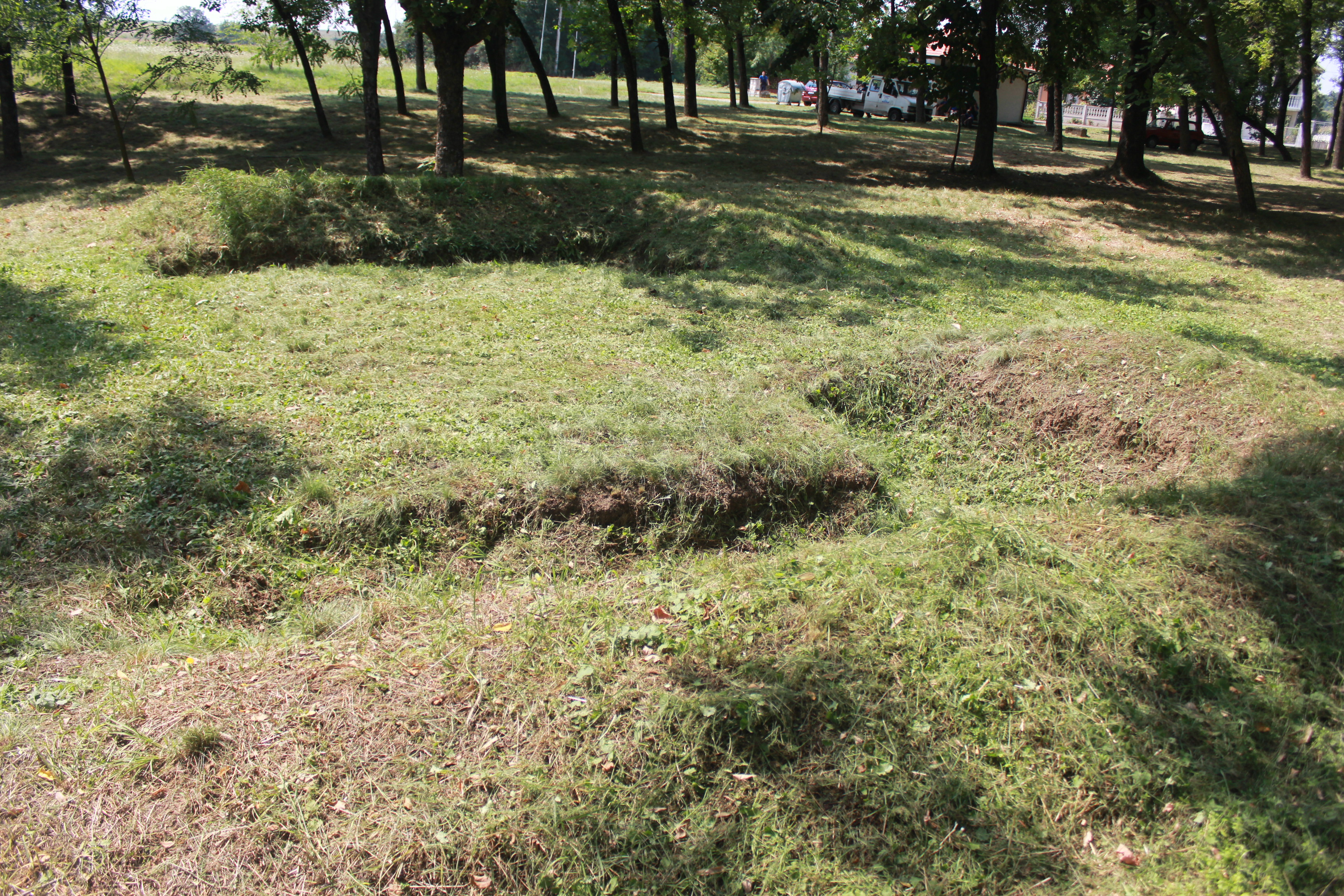
Remains of redoubt of the battle of Ivankovac.

== See also ==
- Timeline of the Serbian Revolution
- List of Serbian Revolutionaries

== Sources ==
- Axelrod, Alan (2003). Profiles in Leadership. Upper Saddle River, New Jersey: Prentice Hall Press. ISBN 978-0-73520-256-6.
- Columbus, Frank H. (1999). Kosovo–Serbia: A Just War?. Hauppauge, New York: Nova Science Publishers. ISBN 978-1-56072-724-8.
- Cox, John K. (2002). The History of Serbia. Westport, Connecticut: Greenwood Press. ISBN 978-0-313-31290-8.
- Jelavich, Charles; Jelavich, Barbara (2000). The Establishment of the Balkan National States, 1804–1920. Vol. 8 (4 ed.). Seattle: University of Washington Press. ISBN 0-295-96413-8.
- Jaques, Tony (2007). Dictionary of Battles and Sieges: P–Z. Greenwood Press. p. 479. ISBN 978-0-313-33539-6.
- Judah, Tim (2000). The Serbs: History, Myth and the Destruction of Yugoslavia (2nd ed.). New Haven, Connecticut: Yale University Press. ISBN 978-0-300-08507-5.
- Merry, Robert W. (2005). Sands of Empire: Missionary Zeal, American Foreign Policy, and the Hazards of Global Ambition. New York: Simon and Schuster. ISBN 0-7432-7438-5.
- Morrison, Walter Angus (1942). The Revolt of the Serbs Against the Turks: 1804–1813. Cambridge: Cambridge University Press. ISBN 978-1-107-67606-0.
- Vučković, Aleksa (2021). The Serbian Revolution: 1804-1835. United States: KDP Print US. p. 19. ISBN 9798702671697.
- Radosavljević, Nedeljko V. (2010). "The Serbian Revolution and the Creation of the Modern State: The Beginning of Geopolitical Changes in the Balkan Peninsula in the 19th Century". Empires and Peninsulas: Southeastern Europe between Karlowitz and the Peace of Adrianople, 1699–1829. Berlin: LIT Verlag. pp. 171–178. ISBN 9783643106117.
- Protić, A. (1892). A history from the time of the Serbian leader Karađorđe. Spomenik (in Serbian).
- Milosavljević, Petar. "Бој на Иванковцу 1805.". Бој на Иванковцу 1805 [La bataille à Ivankovac en 1805]. Belgrade: SANU. pp. 11–66.
- Stojančević, Vladimir (1991). "Ћупријска нахија – Ресава у време Иванковачке битке 1805. године" (PDF). Balcanica. 22. Belgrade: SANU: 101–109.
