= Radošin =

- Village
- Location within Serbia
- Coordinates: 44°07′22″N 21°11′47″E
- Country: Serbia
- District: Pomoravlje District
- Municipality: Svilajnac

Population (2002)
  - Total: 550
- Time zone: UTC+1 (CET)
  - Summer (DST): UTC+2 (CEST)

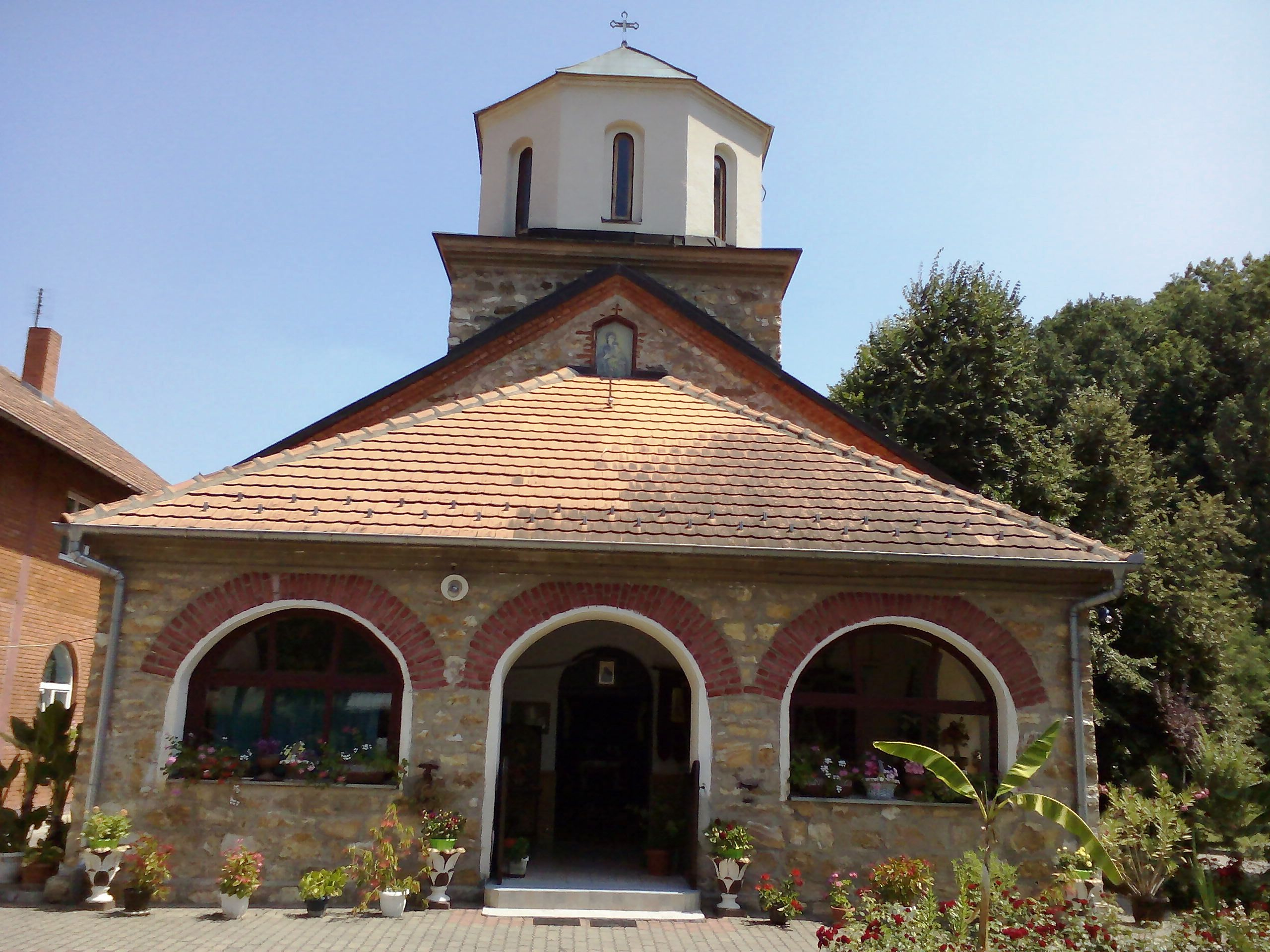
Radošin Monastery in Radošin village.

Radošin is a village in the municipality of Svilajnac, Serbia. According to the 2002 census, the village has a population of 550 people.

In late 1803, bimbaša Milovan Resavac, who lived in the village, joined the conspiration to overthrow the Dahije from the Sanjak of Smederevo. He fought under the command of vojvoda Stevan Sinđelić and fell at Kamenica (31 May 1809).

== Sources ==
- Stojančević, Vladimir (1991). "Ћупријска нахија – Ресава у време Иванковачке битке 1805. године" (PDF). Balcanica. 22. Belgrade: SANU: 101–109.
