= Petar Jokić (revolutionary) =

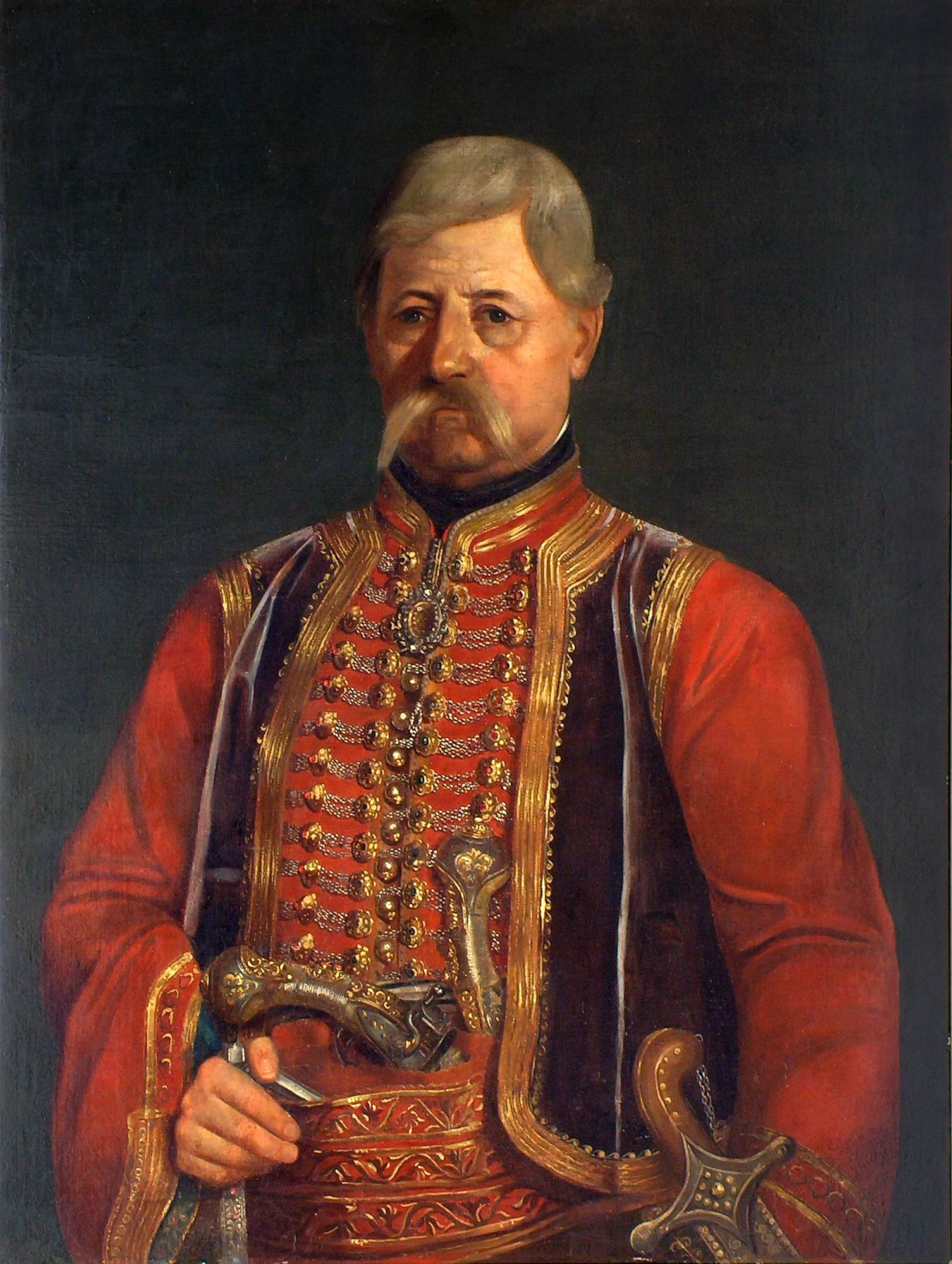
- Portrait of Jokić by Uroš Knežević
- Born: 1779; Topola, Sanjak of Smederevo
- Died: 24 April 1852 (aged 72–73); Topola, Principality of Serbia
- Military career
- Allegiance: Revolutionary Serbia
- Service years: 1804–13
- Rank: buljubaša
- Unit: Karađorđe's personal guard
- Awards: Order of Glory

Petar Jokić (Serbian: Петар Јокић; 1779–1852) also known as Topolac (Тополац), was one of the important participants in the First Serbian Uprising, also credited for collecting material for the history of the turbulent time in which he lived. As an insurgent, he is known mainly to historians, while with the interesting data he provided to historiography, he became known to a wider readership. It was historian Milan Milićević who recorded Petar Jokić's experiences during the First Serbian Uprising on behalf of the Serbian Royal Academy of Sciences before he died. According to the decision of the censor, his testimony could not appear in print during the reign of Prince Aleksandar Karađorđević, but much later, only in 1891. There were two other revolutionaries, Janićije Đurić and Anta Protić, who also wrote their eyewitness accounts about the war of independence.

== Biography ==
Petar Jokić was born in Topola around 1779, and at the time of the uprising, in 1804, he was a young man in full strength. Until then, well known to Karađorđe, Jokić was his right hand in the first days of the preparation for the uprising. Jokić is one of those who threw the first spark in the Turkish hans (inns) and started the battle.

From that time until the whole series of events, Jokić was always in the immediate vicinity of Karađorđe, becoming an officer, a buljubaša, the personal leader of Karađorđe's personal guard. Thus, Jokić had the opportunity to see, hear, learn and do a lot. He survived many difficult situations on the battlefields and overcame many wounds. Heroic, reliable, wise and prudent, Jokić had a serious word in the greatest company of the first dukes (voivodes). The circumstances were often such that the Vožd (Grand Leader Karađorđe) had to be left without his escort detachment at critical moments because it was dispatched where it was most needed at the time. Jokić often only received orders to move, without notice nor explanation. In 1813, he was on the Drina and in Šabac, from where he was preparing for the capture of Belgrade with Miloš Obrenović, but he received news that Belgrade had already been taken by the Ottoman Turks and that Vožd Karađorđe had already crossed the Sava.

After the collapse of the uprising, in 1813, he lived with his family until 1838 in Zemun, then under the rule of the Austrian Empire, where he opened his trading company. After the liberation of Serbia, Jokić returned to his homeland and became a member of the Valjevo District Court until he retired, when he went back to Topola, the place of his birth. He lived there until his death in 1852.
