= Grabovac (Svilajnac) =

- Village
- Location within Serbia
- Coordinates: 44°11′45″N 21°14′39″E
- Country: Serbia
- District: Pomoravlje District
- Municipality: Svilajnac

Population (2002)
  - Total: 1,012
- Time zone: UTC+1 (CET)
  - Summer (DST): UTC+2 (CEST)

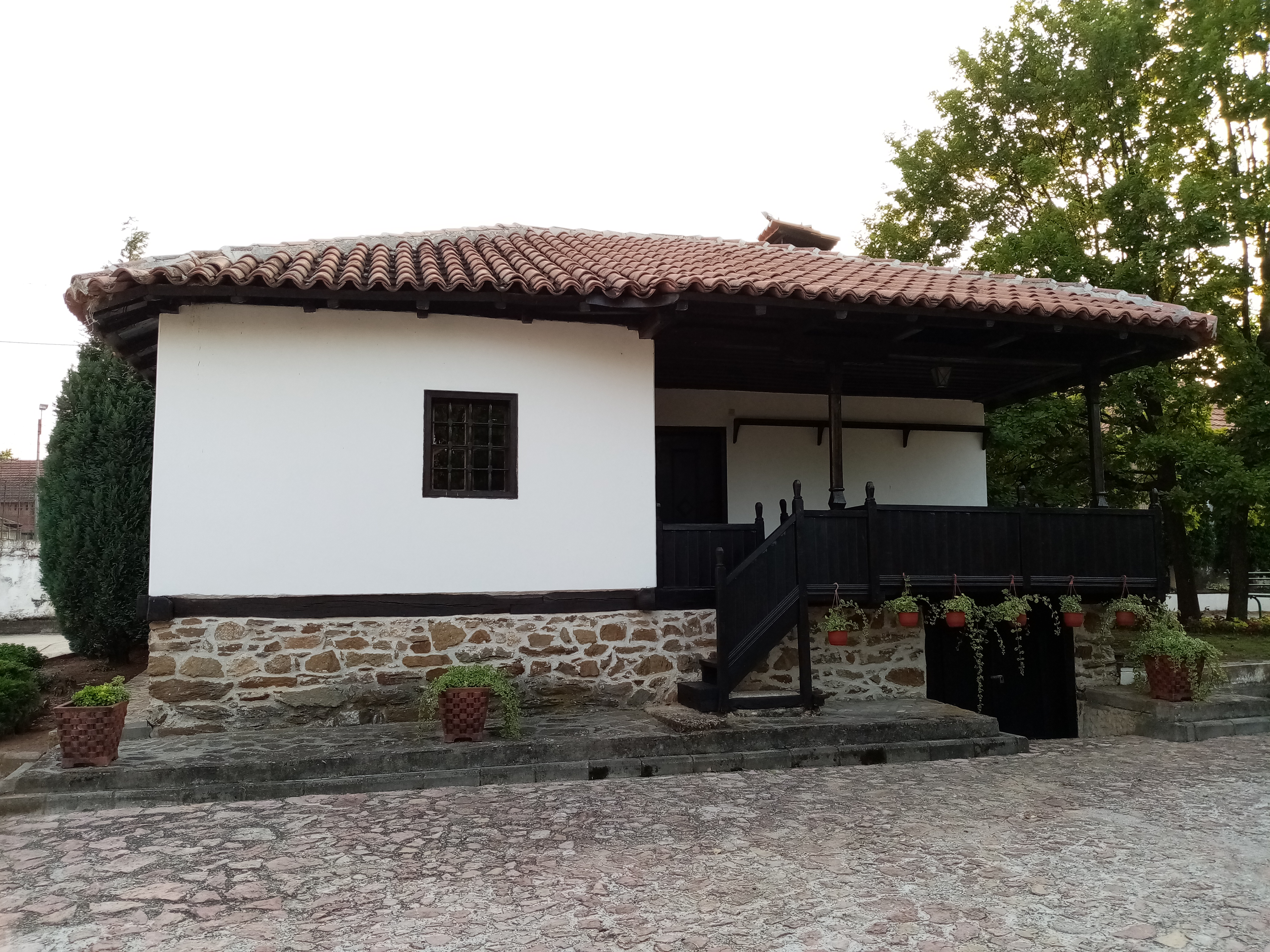
Birth house of Stevan Sinđelić in Grabovac

Grabovac is a village in the municipality of Svilajnac, Serbia. According to the 2002 census, the village has a population of 1012 people. Name of the village derives from the grab forest (lat. Carpinus betulus) that once stood in its spot.

The birth house of Stevan Sinđelić is located in the center of the village and it is open to the public. It serves as an exhibition space with a display depicting the period of the First Serbian Uprising, including original furniture from this region.
