= January 1806 Serbian offensive =

Military operation part of the first Serbian uprising

January 1806 offensive
- Part of First Serbian Uprising
- Planned: 1–12 January 1806
- Planned by: Ostružnica Assembly
- Commanded by: Petar Dobrnjac, Mladen Milovanović, Milenko Stojković
- Objective: Capture of Kruševac, Paraćin, Ražanj, Aleksinac, Poreč
- Date: January–February 1806
- Executed by: Ćuprija, Požarevac, Crna Reka, Paraćin units
- Outcome: Successful

The January 1806 Serbian offensive was undertaken by mainly the Serbian rebel nahija armies of Ćuprija and Požarevac to capture a string of townlets in the southeast of rebel territory, to strengthen defensive positions and stop reinforcements to Belgrade.

== Background ==
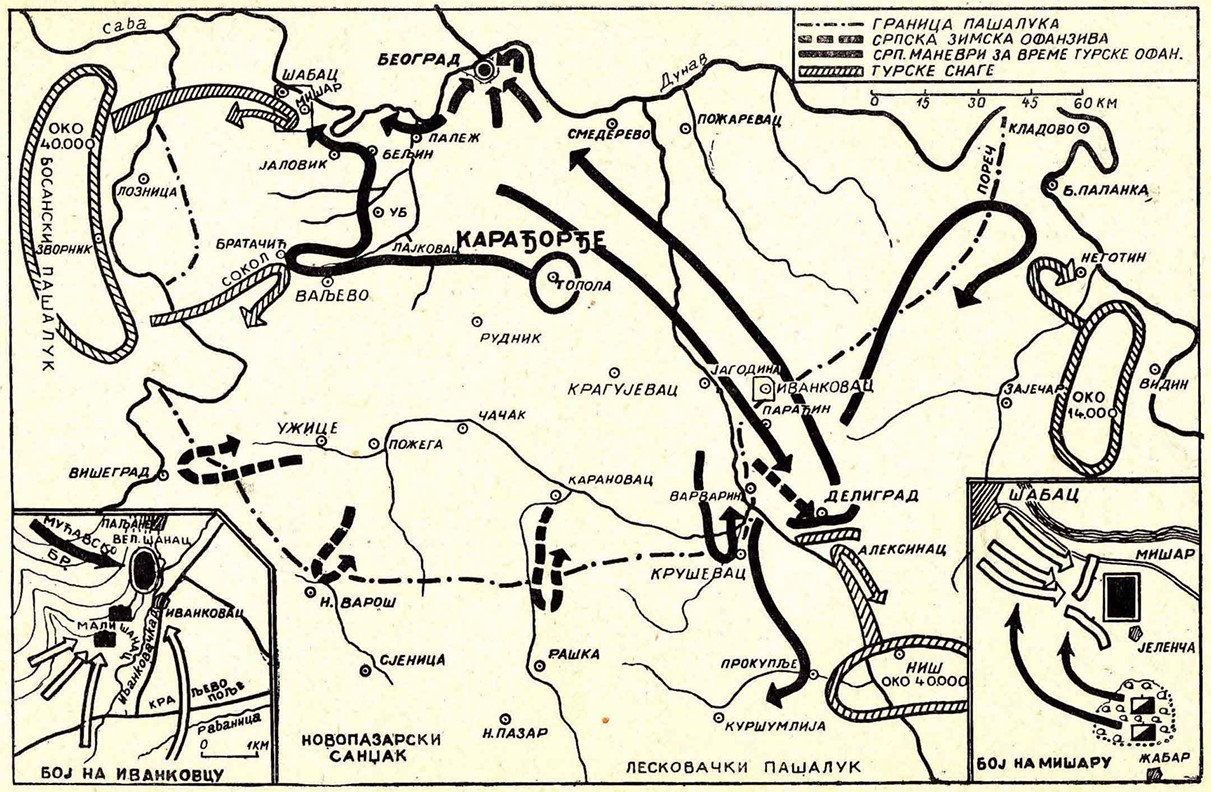
Map of operations in 1805.

In late 1805, the rebel leadership reinforced Drina (countering Bosnia), Belgrade (countering kircali, and offensive action) and Ćuprija (maintaining territory and stopping Morava breakthrough). The Ostružnica Assembly, held 1–12 January 1806, decided on an offensive on all sides, except the Drina, to begin immediately. New conquests and strengthening of defensive positions was decided for the east and southeast front, where the Jagodina and Ćuprija nahija armies were active. The plan was to take the following towns and townlets:

- Kruševac, by Mladen Milovanović, Stanoje Glavaš, Vule Kolarac, Stevan Jakovljević, knez Jevta of Temnić.
- Paraćin, by Ilija Barjaktarević, Ilija Stošić, Milisav Đorđević.
- Ražanj, by Stevan Sinđelić, Milovan Resavac, Čapak Milosav.
- Aleksinac, by Petar Dobrnjac, Paulj Matejić.
- Poreč, by Milenko Stojković, Đorđe of Kruševac, Toma of Gradiška, Petko of Golubovac.

The Ćuprija Turks learnt of rebel preparations and left the town, leaving all of the Ćuprija nahija in Serbian hands.

== Poreč and Negotin ==
The vojvoda Milenko Stojković took over Poreč and Negotin, in the hands of Osman Pazvantoğlu (the ruler of the Sanjak of Vidin), in January 1806.

== Kruševac ==
Mladen Milovanović led the army units of Stanoje Glavaš, Stevan Jakovljević, Vule Kolarac, Jevta of Temnić and Miloje Todorović, including Jagodina nahija troops as well, against Kruševac. The first skirmish took place on 7 January. On 12 January, after a great battle, the rebels took over Kruševac and the Turks retreated to Leskovac. The rebels had c. 50 dead. In another version, according to D. Jovanović (1883), the town of Kruševac surrendered after the rebels had taken over the three townlets of Paraćin, Ražanj and Aleksinac, after 26 January.

== Paraćin, Ražanj, Aleksinac and Banja ==
In the Ćuprija nahija, reinforced in late 1805, an army under the command of Petar Dobrnjac of the Požarevac nahija army was organized with the units of Stevan Sinđelić of Resava (Ćuprija nahija), Ilija Stošić of Homolje (Požarevac nahija), Paulj Matejić of Gornja Mlava (Požarevac nahija), Ilija Barjaktarević of Paraćin nahija, and Milisav Đorđević of Crna Reka (called on by Sinđelić), that set out to take Paraćin, Ražanj and Aleksinac. According to D. Jovanović (1883), Milisav was ordered on 26 January [O.S. 14 January] 1806 to support bimbaša Milovan Resavac in taking over Paraćin, Ražanj and Aleksinac, while Mladen Milovanović was sent to accompany vojvoda Jovan Jakovljević of Levač towards Kruševac.

Paraćin was handed over without a fight by ayan Alibarča or Ali-Borča, after Ilija Barjaktarević had persuaded him, his personal friend, in the beginning of February 1806. All Turks of Paraćin were allowed to leave for Niš, with weapons and property, as per agreement.

Ražanj was offered to surrender by Sinđelić, but the ayan Krnča decided to attack, upon which Sinđelić and buljubaša Jovan Krstikaša of the Ražanj nahija led an assault which resulted in a battle with many casualties on both sides. Krnča escaped, and in retaliation for the losses, the Serbian rebels executed all remaining Turk men in Ražanj, and sent their women naked to Banja.

After looting the area, the rebel army went for Aleksinac. The Aleksinac Turks, under the leadership of ayan Arčin, had heard of the fate of Ražanj, and fled to Niš before the rebels arrived. The rebels entered an empty Aleksinac. After a while Banja (Sokobanja), which was not in rebel plans, under ayan Ćurta was abandoned. The Banja Turks left for Niš with their property. After Aleksinac, Milisav was tasked with defending the area from troops from the Sanjak of Vidin, held by Osman Pazvantoğlu. The rebels also heard that the Pasha of Niš aimed to take Aleksinac with a large army.

== Gornja Poljanica, Trkanja, Dživdžibare ==
Milisav Đorđević camped at Gornja Poljanica where he was reinforced by Milovan Resavac. They were informed by Petar Dobrnjac, the commander of the Ćuprija–Aleksinac line, that Vizier Ibrahim Pasha of Scutari planned an attack. Dobrnjac and Milenko Stojković camped at the Monastery of St. Roman at the time. Milisav and Resavac went towards Deligrad and on the way Milisav was ordered to defend the Trkanja crossroads on the Deligrad–Banja road, as to prevent a rear attack from Vidin or Gurgusovac. According to K. Protić, vojvoda Stevan Sinđelić accompanied Milisav to the Trkanja gorge (around Bovan) to defend the area and Aleksinac from the Turks. Ibrahim Pasha never attacked, and the rebel units returned to their camps. At Poljanica, Milisav received news that Osman Pazvantoğlu himself set out with a large army to Banja. Pazvantoğlu sent a messenger ahead of his army to Resavac that warned the rebels and told them that he would camp towards Banja, at Dživdžibare (now Beli Potok). Drunk in renown, Pazvantoğlu brought cavalry, but no cannons, and thought it would be an easy battle. Arriving via Knjaževac, Pazvantoğlu took Banja and fortified it.

Resavac informed Dobrnjac and Milenko on Pazvantoğlu's message, and as previously planned, Resavac and Milisav attacked from one side, while Dobrnjac, Milenko and Paulj Matejić attacked from the other. At Dživdžibare, Pazvantoğlu camped with his army of the Sanjak of Vidin, as well as local Turk commanders, among whom the notable were Poreč-Alija (the former Dahije mayor of Valjevo), ayan Rušen of Pirot, evildoer Jusuf-Aga from Berkovac, Đendž-aga from Lovech and Ćor-Soliman of Crna Reka. The combined army under Pazvantoğlu numbered 3,000.

Pazvantoğlu's army was decisively defeated at Dživdžibare in February 1806, and Pazvantoğlu barely survived. The combined units of Milisav Đorđević, Milovan Resavac, Stevan Sinđelić, Petar Dobrnjac, Milenko Stojković, Ilija Stošić and Paulj Matejić, numbering 800, destroyed the Turks commanded by Pazvantoğlu, numbering 3,000, at Dživdžibare. Apart from many dead, there were many wounded, allegedly 80 wagons returned for Vidin. The Serbian rebels gained great loot, much gunpowder, weaponry, horses, uniforms and coins. The victory was a huge morale boost. During his retreat, Pazvantoğlu allegedly received a pustule on his hands which later resulted in his death. On the way, the retreating Turk commanders burnt down villages and killed people.

== Aftermath ==
The Ottoman army of Niš never went for Aleksinac, while vojvoda Milisav stayed at Trkanja and monitored the Turks that trenched themselves around Sokobanja, and stopped them from entering Serb villages. The rebels gained a better defensive line and blocked the Morava altogether from incursions, and at Deligrad several earthen fortifications were built. Vuča Žikić, a Free Corps veteran, built a fortification at Jabukovac between Aleksinac and Ražanj, while Milenko Stojković built one at Topoljak near Gornji Ljubeš. Shortly afterwards, vojvoda Milisav and his Crna Reka army moved from Trkanja to Šumadija, in order to finally accompany the siege of Belgrade. The takeover of the towns alarmed the Porte which ordered all Muslims in rebel territory and outside it to fight the rebels and kill all they get their hands on. Karađorđe wanted for the Turks to concentrate on the southern frontier and thus cancel an offensive from two fronts (Drina and Niš), but this failed, and the rebels opted for defensive measures. Ibrahim Pasha was ordered to lead the main army from Sofia on the attack on Serbia in February and March. By Late June, a large Ottoman army was mustered with Ibrahim Pasha's war plans, with the help of French officers, to attack Serbia from three directions: Vidin–Požarevac; Constantinople Road–Ćuprija–Jagodina; and the third, from the Drina.

== See also ==
- Timeline of the Serbian Revolution
- Serbian Army (revolutionary)
- List of Serbian Revolutionaries

== Annotations ==
1. The "battle of Dživdžibare" (Serbian: битка на Џивџибари) took place in February 1806, according to V. Stojančević's dating of Milenko's campaign in Negotin (he earlier dated it to January). D. Jovanović (1883) had dated the reinforcement of Resavac to springtime 1806, and the battle following this.

== Sources ==
- Batalaka, Lazar Arsenijević (1898). Историја српског устанка: део први [History of the Serbian Uprising: Part One]. Vol. I. Izd. Batalakinoga fonda – via Google Books.
- Jovanović, Dragoljub K. (1883). "Црна река" [Crna Reka]. Glasnik Srpskog učenog društva. 54: 187–256 – via Google Books.
- Jovanović, Dobrivoje (2009). Јагодинска, Ћупријска и Параћинска нахија у Првом и Другом српском (PDF). Jagodina: Историјски архив Средње Поморавље. ISBN 978-86-87479-05-0.
- Mirčetić, Dragoljub Ž. (1991). "Југоисточни фронт" (PDF). Лесковачки зборник. 31: 117–140.
- Nenadović, Konstantin N. (1884). Живот и дела великог Ђорђа Петровића Кара-Ђорђа [Life and Deeds of Great Đorđe Petrović Kara-Đorđe]. Vol. II (1 ed.). Vienna: У Штампарији Јована Н. Вернаја – via Google Books.
- Nenadović, Konstantin N. (1903) [1883]. Живот и дела великог Ђорђа Петровића Кара-Ђорђа [Life and Deeds of Great Đorđe Petrović Kara-Đorđe]. Vol. I (2 ed.). Belgrade: Штампа Савића и Комп. – via Archive.org.
- Protić, Kosta (1893). "Ратни догађаји из првога српског устанка под Карађорђем Петровићем 1804—1813". Годишњица Николе Чупића. XIII. Državna štamparija.
