= Petar Džoda =

Serbian commander (1770–c.1815)

- Петар Ђорђевић
- Born: Petar Đorđević; 1770; Kučajna near Brestovac, Ottoman Empire
- Died: after 1815
- Military career
- Allegiance: Revolutionary Serbia (1804–15)
- Service years: 1804–1815
- Rank: buljubaša, bimbaša, vojvoda
- Nickname: Džoda
- Units: Karađorđe's Corps (1804–1807); Crna Reka (1807–1813)
- Commands: Trench commander
- Conflicts: First Serbian Uprising

Petar Đorđević (Serbian: Петар Ђорђевић; 1770–1813), known as Džoda (Џода), was a Serbian commander (vojvoda) active in the First Serbian Uprising, the Serb rebellion against the Ottoman Empire. He was mostly given the command of trenches in the frontiers and was known to have had a low character.

== Early life ==
Petar Đorđević, nicknamed Džoda, was born in the village of Kučajna, near Brestovac, in the nahiya of Crna Reka. The village was burnt down during the Austro-Turkish War and never rebuilt, and Džoda's family moved to Strmosten near the Manasija monastery. He was a hajduk (bandit, brigand) prior to the uprising.

== Uprising ==
Džoda was among the numerous volunteers from outside the Sanjak of Smederevo. He participated in many important battles, such as Ivankovac, Paraćin, Ražanj, Aleksinac and Belgrade. Džoda participated in the victorious siege of Belgrade (December 1806) which made the capital of the Sanjak of Smederevo finally in Serbian hands.

=== Beginning of uprising ===
Crna Reka was part of the Pashalik of Vidin under Osman Pazvantoglu. In 1805 Pazvantoglu appointed affluent merchant Milisav Đorđević the obor-knez of the Crna Reka nahiya. Despite Pazvantoglu's good holding towards the Christians in his pashalik, Milisav Đorđević and his friend, priest Radosav from Planinica, joined the Serbian uprising, which would be important for the later operations in Crna Reka. The uprising that broke out in Crna Reka after Easter 1805 was paused after fearing Pazvantoglu's power and support from Šumadija never came; Pazvantoglu amnestied the local rebels and Crna Reka was left untouched by Ottoman troops. The Serb rebels however continued, and sent people into Crna Reka that gathered hundreds and worked primarily on fortification of defensive positions. Hajduk bands made incursions into Timočka Krajina. After hearing that Hafiz Mustafa Pasha set out from Niš, an army was mustered, including also Crna Reka rebels under Milisav, that fought and decisively defeated the Ottoman army at the Ivankovac field (18 August [O.S. 7 August] 1805). Džoda participated in the battle. On 14 January 1806, Milisav was ordered to support Resavac in taking over Paraćin, Ražanj and Aleksinac, while Mladen Milovanović was sent to accompany vojvoda Jovan Jakovljević of Levač towards Kruševac. After taking over Aleksinac, Milisav was tasked with defending the area from troops from the Sanjak of Vidin.

=== Krajina campaign ===
Following the liberation of Belgrade (December 1806), vojvoda Milisav Đorđević, the leader in Crna Reka, with priest Radosav approached and asked supreme commander Karađorđe to aid in taking over Crna Reka. Karađorđe ordered for them to meet up with vojvoda Resavac and vojvoda Ilija Barjaktarović who would give them soldiers and support them. Džoda (who hailed from Crna Reka) and Papazoglija (a Bulgarian former kırcalı bandit) were among those in Karađorđe's army that he sent with them. Stanoje Glavaš suggested that they also be accompanied by buljubaša Hajduk Veljko, which they gladly accepted, as they knew him personally. The detachment gathered at Ravanica and then attacked Osman Bey at Podgorac, who surrendered. Džoda joined the band of Veljko and became one of his bimbaša. After this, the detachment split and sought to take over as much as possible, with the unit of Džoda and buljubaša Đorđe from Podgorac being sent into the mountain, the troops of Milisav and Veljko went towards Zaječar, while a camp was set up below the Tupižnica at the Trešnjevica river. From the camp, the population in the area was risen and incursions made into the nahiyas of Gurgusovac and Vidin.

Hajduk Veljko led the successful operation against ayan Süleyman of Zaječar (known as Serbian: Ћор-Солиман), with a decisive victory at Vrbovac that echoed in all of Timočka Krajina. Veljko proceeded towards Gurgusovac and collected volunteers, while vojvoda Milisav was appointed knez (governor) of the Crna Reka nahija. Veljko and Milisav failed to take Gurgusovac, and vojvoda Resavac left the siege of Zaječar, to aid Stojković who faced the enemy at Malajnica. After the important victory at Štubik-Malajnica, Zaječar was left by the Turks and Karađorđe acknowledged vojvoda Milisav as the knez of Crna Reka, and also appointed priest Radosav, Džoda and Papazoglija his cabinet. After Zaječar and the news of Russian troops in the area, the Turks left Gurgusovac and Sokobanja, which made the whole area empty of Turks. Veljko was appointed vojvoda of the Banja nahija and Karađorđe then returned to Topola.

=== Trench command ===
Džoda was subordinated knez Milisav of Crna Reka. He commanded the Vražogrnac trench.

During a cease-fire bimbaša Papazoglija stationed in Crna Reka crossed into Ottoman territory and brought great damage, according to which the Ottomans complained to Russia. Serbian supreme commander Karađorđe received an order by the Russians to issue penalties to any who cross into Ottoman territory. Papazoglija, not respecting the order, took 300 cavalrymen and as many infantry and penetrated as far as the field of Sofia. There he killed a Turk hero in a duel, for which he was celebrated. He returned to Crna Reka with great plunder, and was a guest at Džoda's, who murdered him with an axe during his sleep. It is alleged that Hajduk-Veljko and Petar Dobrnjac ordered his murder, due to either the Russian threat, or due to his exceeding fame. Džoda sent Papazoglija's head to Karađorđe, who however became disappointed in Džoda for it. The news of Papazoglija's death was met with celebration among the Turks in the Sanjak of Vidin. Another story has it that Džoda was jealous and therefore had Papazoglija killed, and that Papazoglija was Veljko's brave comrade.

In 1809 Džoda defended the fortified Krivelj from the Turks for two months, which enabled the withdrawal of the Serbian army from Poreč and Timok too.

In 1811, Karađorđe divided the Crna Reka nahija into two, the Zaječar and Vražogrnac, the former under Milisav and the latter under Džoda. Veljko diminishingly called the newly appointed lesser commanders poulterers (kokošari).

In late March 1813 he was transferred to Zaječar to command a trench under vojvoda Milisav Đorđević. After the fall of Negotin, he left through Kijak on the Žagubica road. After the uprising was quelled in 1813, Džoda fled to the Habsburg Monarchy and lived in Nova Palanka. Upon the outbreak of the Second Serbian Uprising, he returned to Serbia and fought. He later joined the hajduks and is said to have died while fighting.

== Character ==
Džoda was a hajduk prior to joining the Serbian uprising. He was known for his low character, having beaten or killed his soldiers for lesser faults. After battles, he took most of his soldiers' loot for himself. He was said to have not distinguished himself in battles in the later period following his promotion to vojvoda, as he stayed out of danger. For no reason, he started an argument with his bimbaša Dane Pavlović from Zvezdan, a personal friend of Veljko, and then had his security beat him and break all his bones. Pavlović died shortly after.

He came into conflict with others while stationed at Vražogrnac, cursing them, which resulted in disciplinary warnings. The events were registered in Karađorđe' protocols. Despite the complaints about him at the Senate, as he was on good terms with Karađorđe and Mladen Milovanović, he remained at his post.

Hajduk Veljko called Džoda and other newly appointed lesser commanders poulterers (kokošari).

== See also ==
- List of Serbian Revolutionaries

== Sources ==
- Batalaka, Lazar Arsenijević (1898). Историја српског устанка. Vol. I. Izd. Batalakinoga fonda. pp. 721, 724, 725, 792–793, 1009.
- Jovanović, Dragoljub K. (1883). "Црна река". Glasnik Srpskog učenog društva. 54: 187–256.
- Milićević, Milan (1888). Поменик знаменитих људи у српскога народа новијега доба (in Serbian). Srpska kraljevska štamparija. pp. 510–511.
- Nenadović, Konstantin N. (1884). Живот и дела великог Ђорђа Петровића Кара-Ђорђа. Vol. II (1 ed.). Vienna: У Штампарији Јована Н. Вернаја. pp. 734–735 – via Google Books.
- Nenadović, Konstantin N. (1903) [1883]. Живот и дела великог Ђорђа Петровића Кара-Ђорђа. Vol. I (2 ed.). Belgrade: Штампа Савића и Комп. – via Archive.org.

Protić, Kosta (1893). "Ратни догађаји из првога српског устанка под Карађорђем Петровићем 1804—1813". Годишњица Николе Чупића. XIII. Državna štamparija.
