= Ilija Stošić =

Serbian commander (??–1817)

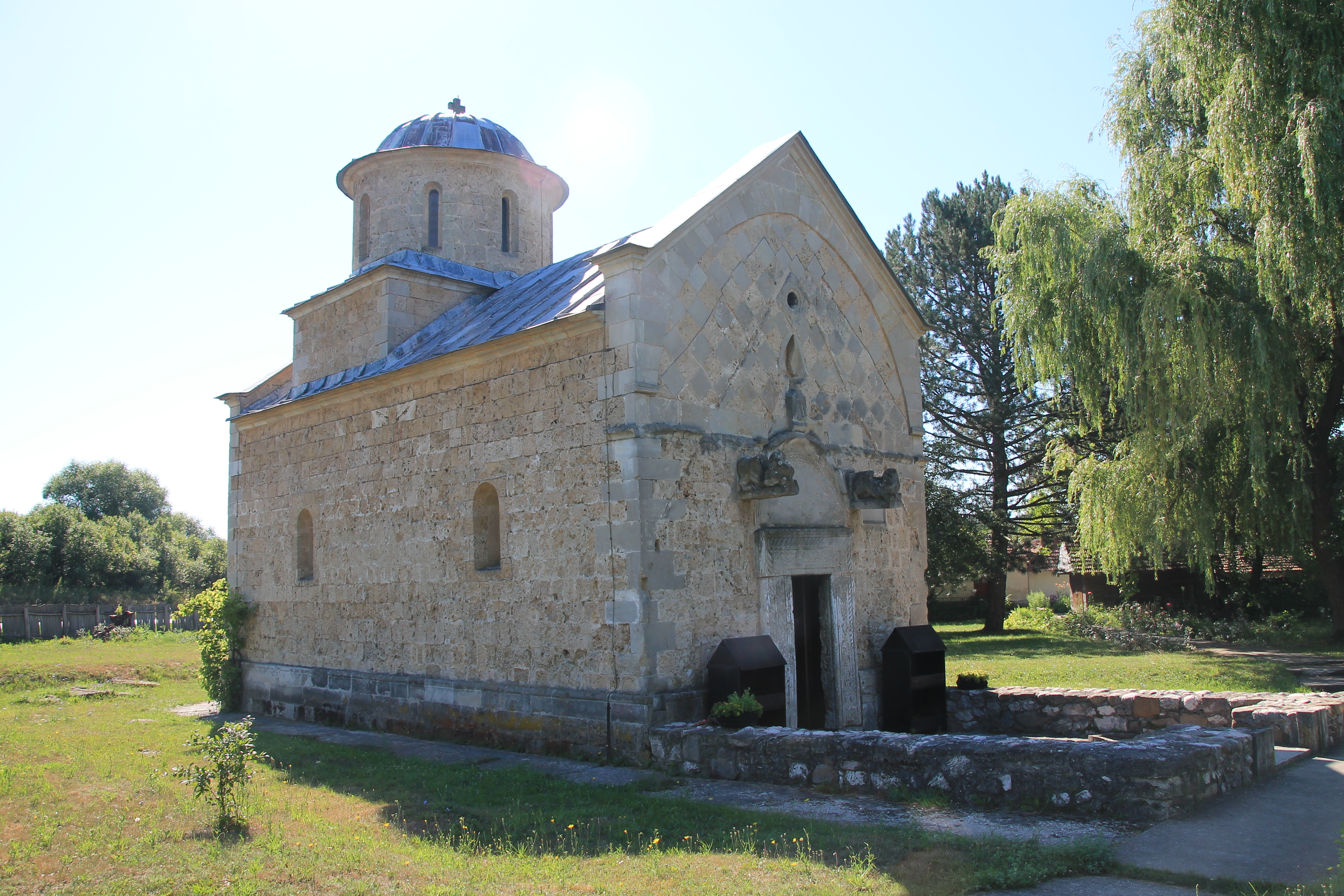
- Trška church, where Stošić was buried and to which he was ktetor (donator)
- Born: Žagubica, Sanjak of Smederevo, Ottoman Empire
- Died: after 1817; Žagubica, Principality of Serbia
- Military career
- Allegiance: Revolutionary Serbia
- Service years: 1804–1813
- Rank: buljubaša, vojvoda (II. class)
- Units: Homolje (1804–1813); Vražogrnac trench (1807–1812)
- Commands: Homolje–Timok area
- Known for: leader in Homolje
- Conflicts: First Serbian Uprising

Ilija Stošić (Serbian: Илија Стошић; fl. 1804–1817) was a Serbian commander of the Homolje area in the First Serbian Uprising (1804–1813), beginning as a buljubaša (captain) under the command of vojvoda Petar Dobrnjac protecting the roads coming from the frontiers of Crna Reka and Negotinska Krajina. He was promoted to vojvoda (commander) of Homolje in eastern Serbia in 1811.

== Career ==
Ilija was born in the village of Žagubica in the Homolje region. With the outbreak of the uprising against the Dahije in early 1804, Petar Dobrnjac, a leader in the Požarevac nahija, appointed him the buljubaša (captain) of Homolje.

After the failed rebellion in Crna Reka led by Milisav Đorđević and Pop-Radosav in 1805 against Pasha Osman Pazvantoglu, Milisav decided to continue to fight and joined the rebels in the Resava region. Milisav met with Milovan Resavac, Petar Dobrnjac, Ilija Stošić and Ilija Barjaktarović at Senj, and received a war-flag (barjak) and 150 troops to accompany him on rallying the Crna Reka region and to initially fortify defensive positions.

In July 1805 the Sultan sent Hafiz Pasha to defeat the Serbian rebels. While Hafiz mustered a large army from the Sanjak of Niš, Karađorđe took Karanovac and ordered Jakov Nenadović to operate in Soko and Užice, while he set out for Jagodina to counter Hafiz Pasha. Karađorđe organized an army of 4–5,000 men of Belgrade, Smederevo, Kragujevac and Jagodina areas to hold the line left of the Morava from Jagodina to Gilja and protect the Belgrade–Niš main road. On the opposite side of the Morava, in the space leading to Resava and Pomoravlje and the city of Smederevo, Karađorđe left Milenko Stojković and Petar Dobrnjac with 2,500 men of the Požarevac nahija. Among the troops already in place there, were Stevan Sinđelić with the Resava troops, Ilija Stošić with the Homolje troops, Paulj Matejić with the Gornja Mlava troops and Milisav Crnorečanin with the Crna Reka troops. Milenko's army fortified itself at Ivankovac, which was attacked by Hafiz Pasha's 30,000-strong army on 17 August [O.S. 6 August] 1805 and into the next day, but the Ottomans failed to take it. The victory at Ivankovac was crucial for the uprising. The combined units of Milisav Đorđević, Stevan Sinđelić, Petar Dobrnjac, Ilija Stošić and Paulj Matejić, numbering 800, destroyed the Turks commanded by Osman Pazvantoğlu, numbering 3,000, at Dživdžibare.

Ilija mostly protected the rebel territory towards Crna Reka, and had a trench built above Žagubica (known as Stošićeva Straža) from where roads coming from the frontiers of Crna Reka and Negotinska Krajina were protected. Upon the liberation of Crna Reka and Krajina in 1807, Ilija operated towards the Timok river and participated in setting up the important trench at Vražogrnac. The commander of Crna Reka was vojvoda and knez Milisav Đorđević.

The church bell and iconostasis of the Trška church were donated by Ilija Stošić 1810 and 1811, respectively, and his name is inscribed in several of the icons.

Ilija became vojvoda (of the II. class) of Homolje in 1811, while based at Vražogrnac. A total of seven vojvoda were appointed in the Požarevac nahija, including also Ivo Momirović, Živko Šljivić, Tomo Jovanović, Jovan Stevanović, Paulj Matejić and Rajica. Hajduk Veljko diminishingly called the newly appointed lesser commanders poulterers (kokošari).

On 19 June 1812, still based at Vražogrnac, he attested the adoption of a child. After this, he was ordered to base operations in Kladovo, and participated in its defense from Ottoman attacks. With the quelling of the uprising by the Ottomans in 1813, Ilija and his family fled across the Danube into Austrian territory, as most other commanders. After ten days since his flight, Homolje serfs were ordered to set his konak (mansion) and kula (tower house) on fire. Ilija moved to the Russian Empire where he remained until 1817, then moved back to the newly established Principality of Serbia under Miloš Obrenović who had successfully led the Second Serbian Uprising (1815). Obrenović had allowed Ilija to return to his estate in a letter dated 23 June 1817.

Ilija Stošić died after some years living peacefully in Žagubica, and was buried at the Trška church, to which he was a ktetor. He was described as tall and burly, wearing short and thick mustache, and was all grey-haired by 1813. His daughter Milosava married Stevan Protić in Požarevac, and they had a son, Kosta Protić, the general.

== See also ==
- Serbian Army (revolutionary)
- List of Serbian Revolutionaries
- Timeline of the Serbian Revolution

== Sources ==
- Batalaka, Lazar Arsenijević (1899). Историја српског устанка [History of the Serbian Uprising]. Vol. II. Izd. Batalakinoga fonda.
- Jovanović, Dragoljub K. (1883). "Црна река". Glasnik Srpskog učenog društva. 54: 187–256.
- Karadžić, Vuk Stefanović (1898). Jovanović, Lj. (ed.). Грађа за српску историју нашега времена: и животи најзнатнијих поглавица овога времена. Штампарија краљевине Србије.
- Milićević, Milan Đ. (1888). Поменик знаменитих људи у српског народа новијега доба. Издање Чупићеве задужбине. pp. 694–676 – via Archive.org.
- Milosavljević, Petar (1979). Бој на Иванковцу 1805 [La bataille à Ivankovac en 1805]. Belgrade: SANU. pp. 11–66.
- Nenadović, Konstantin N. (1884). Живот и дела великог Ђорђа Петровића Кара-Ђорђа. Vol. II (1 ed.). Vienna: У Штампарији Јована Н. Вернаја – via Google Books.
- Protić, Kosta (1893). "Ратни догађаји из првога српског устанка под Карађорђем Петровићем 1804—1813". Годишњица Николе Чупића. XIII. Državna štamparija.
