= Milisav Đorđević =

Serbian commander (??–1832)

- Born: Suhotno, Sanjak of Smederevo, Ottoman Empire
- Died: 26 March 1832; Svilajnica, Principality of Serbia
- Other name: Milosav Crnorečanin
- Military career
- Allegiance: Revolutionary Serbia
- Service years: 1804–1813
- Rank: vojvoda
- Nicknames: Crnorečanin, Zaječarski
- Units: Crna Reka (1805–1813); Resava (1805–1806)
- Commands: Crna Reka area
- Known for: leader in Crna Reka
- Conflicts: First Serbian Uprising

Milisav Đorđević (Serbian: Милисав; fl. 1804 – d. 1832) was a Serbian commander of the Crna Reka area in the First Serbian Uprising (1804–13). He was promoted to vojvoda (commander) of Crna Reka in eastern Serbia in 1811.

== Career ==
Milisav was born in the village of Suhotno (now Gornje and Donje) in the Mali Jastrebac mountain area. Her mother remarried upon his father's death and the family moved to Lasovo in Crna Reka, where Milisav was brought up. He became a cooper (kačar) and quickly became influential, being appointed a kmet (serf) by the villagers and then obor-knez of the knežina of Crna Reka.

Crna Reka was part of the Pashalik of Vidin under Osman Pazvantoglu. In 1805 Pazvantoglu appointed affluent merchant Milisav Đorđević the obor-knez of the Crna Reka nahiya. Despite Pazvantoglu's good holding towards the Christians in his pashalik, Milisav Đorđević and his friend, priest Radosav from Planinica, joined the Serbian uprising, which would be important for the later operations in Crna Reka. The uprising that broke out in Crna Reka after Easter 1805, led by Milisav and Pop-Radosav, was paused after fearing Pazvantoglu's power and support from Šumadija never came; Pazvantoglu amnestied the local rebels and Crna Reka was left untouched by Ottoman troops. Milisav decided to continue to fight and joined the rebels in the Resava region. Milisav met with Milovan Resavac, Petar Dobrnjac, Ilija Stošić and Ilija Barjaktarović at Senj, and received a war-flag (barjak) and 150 troops to accompany him on rallying the Crna Reka region and to initially fortify defensive positions. Hajduk bands made incursions into Timočka Krajina.

In July 1805 the Sultan sent Hafiz Pasha to defeat the Serbian rebels. While Hafiz mustered a large army from the Sanjak of Niš, Karađorđe took Karanovac and ordered Jakov Nenadović to operate in Soko and Užice, while he set out for Jagodina to counter Hafiz Pasha. Karađorđe organized an army of 4–5,000 men of Belgrade, Smederevo, Kragujevac and Jagodina areas to hold the line left of the Morava from Jagodina to Gilja and protect the Belgrade–Niš main road. On the opposite side of the Morava, in the space leading to Resava and Pomoravlje and the city of Smederevo, Karađorđe left Milenko Stojković and Petar Dobrnjac with 2,500 men of the Požarevac nahija. Among the troops already in place there, were Stevan Sinđelić with the Resava troops, Ilija Stošić with the Homolje troops, Paulj Matejić with the Gornja Mlava troops and Milisav with the Crna Reka troops. Milenko's army fortified itself at Ivankovac, which was attacked by Hafiz Pasha's 30,000-strong army on 17 August [O.S. 6 August] 1805 and into the next day, but the Ottomans failed to take it. The victory at Ivankovac (18 August [O.S. 7 August] 1805), which Milisav and the Crna Reka troops participated in, was crucial for the uprising.

On 14 January 1806, Milisav was ordered to support Resavac in taking over Paraćin, Ražanj and Aleksinac, while Mladen Milovanović was sent to accompany vojvoda Jovan Jakovljević of Levač towards Kruševac. After taking over Aleksinac, Milisav was tasked with defending the area from troops from the Sanjak of Vidin. The combined units of Milisav Đorđević, Stevan Sinđelić, Petar Dobrnjac, Ilija Stošić and Paulj Matejić, numbering 800, destroyed the Turks commanded by Osman Pazvantoğlu, numbering 3,000, at Dživdžibare.

Following the liberation of Belgrade (December 1806), vojvoda Milisav Đorđević, the leader in Crna Reka, with priest Radosav approached and asked supreme commander Karađorđe to aid in taking over Crna Reka. Karađorđe ordered for them to meet up with vojvoda Resavac and vojvoda Ilija Barjaktarović who would give them soldiers and support them. Petar Džoda (who hailed from Crna Reka) and Papazoglija (a Bulgarian former kırcalı bandit) were among those in Karađorđe's army that he sent with them. Stanoje Glavaš suggested that they also be accompanied by buljubaša Hajduk Veljko, which they gladly accepted, as they knew him personally. The detachment gathered at Ravanica and then attacked Osman Bey at Podgorac, who surrendered. After this, the detachment split and sought to take over as much as possible, with the unit of Džoda and buljubaša Đorđe from Podgorac being sent into the mountain, the troops of Milisav and Veljko went towards Zaječar, while a camp was set up below the Tupižnica at the Trešnjevica river. From the camp, the population in the area was risen and incursions made into the nahiyas of Gurgusovac and Vidin.

Hajduk Veljko led the successful operation against ayan Süleyman of Zaječar (known as Serbian: Ћор-Солиман), with a decisive victory at Vrbovac that echoed in all of Timočka Krajina. Veljko proceeded towards Gurgusovac and collected volunteers, while vojvoda Milisav was appointed knez (governor) of the Crna Reka nahija. Veljko and Milisav failed to take Gurgusovac, and vojvoda Resavac left the siege of Zaječar, to aid Stojković who faced the enemy at Malajnica. After the important victory at Štubik-Malajnica, Zaječar was left by the Turks and Karađorđe acknowledged vojvoda Milisav as the knez of Crna Reka, and also appointed priest Radosav, Džoda and Papazoglija his cabinet. After Zaječar and the news of Russian troops in the area, the Turks left Gurgusovac and Sokobanja, which made the whole area empty of Turks. Veljko was appointed vojvoda of the Banja nahija and Karađorđe then returned to Topola.

In 1811, Karađorđe divided the Crna Reka nahija into two, the Zaječar and Vražogrnac, the former under Milisav and the latter under Džoda. In late March 1813 Džoda was transferred to Zaječar to command a trench under vojvoda Milisav Đorđević.

With the quelling of the uprising by the Ottomans in 1813, Milisav and his family fled across the Danube into Austrian territory, as most other commanders. Milisav moved to the Russian Empire where he remained until 1816, then moved back to the newly established Principality of Serbia under Miloš Obrenović who had successfully led the Second Serbian Uprising (1815). Milisav lived in Svilajnica where he continued to work as a cooper. He died in Svilajnica on 26 March 1832.

== See also ==
- Serbian Army (revolutionary)
- List of Serbian Revolutionaries
- Timeline of the Serbian Revolution

== Sources ==
- Batalaka, Lazar Arsenijević (1899). Историја српског устанка [History of the Serbian Uprising]. Vol. II. Izd. Batalakinoga fonda.
- Jovanović, Dragoljub K. (1883). "Црна река". Glasnik Srpskog učenog društva. 54: 187–256.
- Karadžić, Vuk Stefanović (1898). Jovanović, Lj. (ed.). Грађа за српску историју нашега времена: и животи најзнатнијих поглавица овога времена. Штампарија краљевине Србије.
- Milićević, Milan Đ. (1888). Поменик знаменитих људи у српског народа новијега доба. Издање Чупићеве задужбине. p. 156 – via Archive.org.
- Milosavljević, Petar (1979). Бој на Иванковцу 1805 [La bataille à Ivankovac en 1805]. Belgrade: SANU. pp. 11–66.
- Nenadović, Konstantin N. (1884). Живот и дела великог Ђорђа Петровића Кара-Ђорђа. Vol. II (1 ed.). Vienna: У Штампарији Јована Н. Вернаја – via Google Books.
- Protić, Kosta (1893). "Ратни догађаји из првога српског устанка под Карађорђем Петровићем 1804—1813". Годишњица Николе Чупића. XIII. Državna štamparija.
