= Bimbaša =

Military rank of the Serbian Army

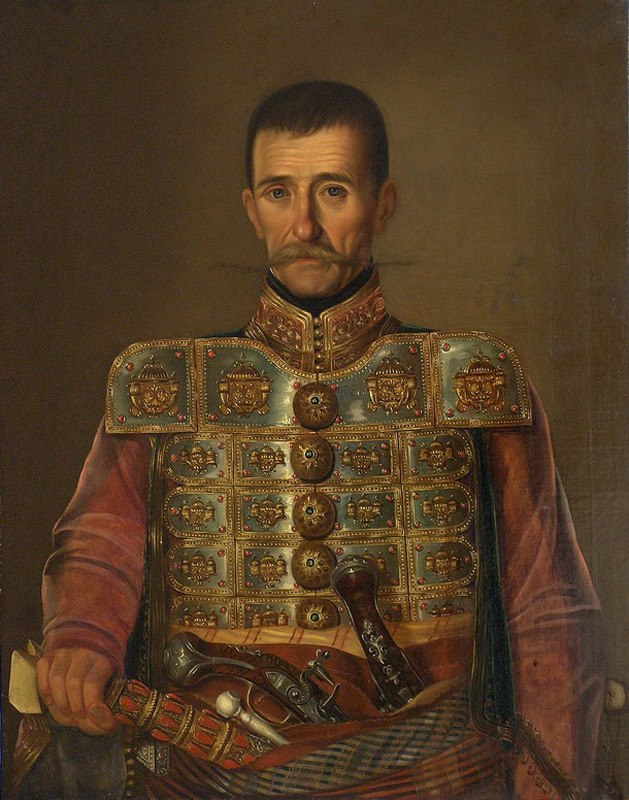
Uzun-Mirko (1782–1868) distinguished himself in the First Serbian Uprising as a bimbaša, participating in the major battles and being wounded seven times.

Bimbaša (Serbian: бимбаша, from Turkish: binbaşı, "chiliarch") was a military rank of the Serbian Army during the First Serbian Uprising (1804–13), adopted from Ottoman usage, traditionally used among the hajduks for commanders. In the initial years, it was lesser in rank than vojvoda (commander, general) and higher than buljubaša (rendered as "captain"). The ranks of kapetan and podvojvoda (sub-vojvoda) were then introduced, among others, and the ranks of bimbaša and buljubaša subsequently were removed from usage by the end of the uprising.

== History ==
=== Free Corps and militia ===
The rank was traditionally used among the hajduks for commanders, and was thus used in the Serbian Free Corps (which included hajduks) that fought in central Serbia during the Austro-Turkish War (1788–1791). It was then used in the Serbian militia of the Sanjak of Smederevo that aided Vizier Hadji Mustafa Pasha against the renegade Janissaries and Pazvantoglu in the 1790s. This militia allegedly numbered up to 16,000, mostly composed of rayah and also some Free Corps veterans. Of them, every fifty people had their buljubaša, over a hundred there was a harambaša and over a thousand bimbaša, adopted from the Ottoman Turkish military ranks. The knezes of the knežina (Christian self-governing village groups) mustered this militia, led by several buljubaša, all commanded by Stanko Arambašić as bimbaša.

=== First Serbian Uprising ===
Following the outbreak of the uprising, Milenko Stojković, a former militia buljubaša, self-styled himself bimbaša. Milenko Stojković and Petar Dobrnjac were the leading commanders in the Požarevac nahiya, the latter serving as buljubaša of the former; through distinction, Dobrnjac was acknowledged as bimbaša by the Serbian Governing Council by late 1805.

Vuk Karadžić wrote an anecdote about how Hajduk Veljko, while only officially ranked a buljubaša, after setting out to Crna Reka in early 1807, sent a bimbaša as his representative with a bag of looted coins to the Governing Council; confused, the Council asked "if you are a bimbaša, what is Hajduk Veljko?", receiving the answer "he is the gospodar ("lord")".

== Holders ==
Serbian Revolution

- Milenko Stojković (1769–1831), former militia buljubaša, self-styled bimbaša at the start of the uprising, became vojvoda and one of the main leaders.
- Petar Dobrnjac (1771–1831), former hajduk, promoted from buljubaša to bimbaša and vojvoda.
- Uzun-Mirko (1782–1868).
- Toša Đorđević (1790–1850), former hajduk, promoted from buljubaša to bimbaša of Zaglavak in 1811.
- Sima Katić-Prekodrinac (1783–1833), served Stojan Čupić who promoted him to buljubaša in the Drina area, then to bimbaša in 1808, and finally vojvoda by Karađorđe in 1812.
- Miloje Petrović-Trnavac (1760–1810), buljubaša of his godfather Mladen Milovanović, promoted to bimbaša of bećari.
- Milutin Petrović-Era (1791–), brother of Hajduk Veljko, whom he served as bimbaša, being promoted to vojvoda of Negotin in 1813 following Veljko's death.
- Jovan Stevanović (1777–1817), former obor-knez in Poreč, promoted to bimbaša by vojvoda Milenko Stojković, became vojvoda of Poreč in early 1811 when Milenko left Serbia.
- Karapavle Simeunović, bimbaša active in Smederevo nahija.
- Petko Vasiljević (1780–1809), bimbaša active in Timok under Hajduk Veljko.
- Milovan Resavac, active in Resava, comrade of Stevan Sinđelić, from Radošin.
- Petar Džoda (1770–1813), bimbaša active in Timok and Crna Reka under Hajduk Veljko, promoted to vojvoda of Vražogrnac in 1811.
- Dragan Papazoglu (d. 1807), former kırcalı (bandit), bimbaša active in Crna Reka under Hajduk Veljko.
- Miloš Stojićević Pocerac (1776–1811), bimbaša under vojvoda Jakov Nenadović, promoted to vojvoda of Pocerina in 1806.
- Stojan Abraš (1780–1813), former hajduk, Hajduk Veljko's blood brother.
- Ilija Strelja (d. 1825), bimbaša promoted to vojvoda.
- Stanoje Pucar, bimbaša active in Čačak-Požega nahija, fell at Zasavica, from Nova Varoš.
- Marinko, from Pirot.
- Nikola Popović, from Niš.
- Zdravko, bimbaša under Hajduk Veljko.
- Mina Bimbaša.
- Jovča Mihailović "Konda" (fl. 1807–13).
- Perica N., from Miokovci in Rudnička Morava knežina.
- Vasilj Miloradović, from Tavnik in Rudnička Morava knežina.
- Stefan Aleksić (1784–1820), bimbaša of Karađorđe, from Lipnica in Čačanska Morava–Podibar knežina.
- Puša N., from Studenica, active in Čačak nahija.

== Sources ==
- Batalaka, Lazar Arsenijević (1898). Историја српског устанка. Vol. I. Izd. Batalakinoga fonda.
- Bodrožić, Đuro (2022). "Vojska i država: počeci moderne srpske vojske". Nacionalni Interes. 44 (2): 29–46. doi:10.22182/ni.4222022.2 (inactive 25 July 2025).
- Đorđević, Tihomir R. (1921). "Кнежине у Србији за време прве владе Кнеза Милоша". Српски књижевни гласник, нова серија. 4: 508–518, 600–611.
- Gavrilović, Andra (1904). Црте из историје ослобођења Србије. Belgrade: Нздање дворске књижаре Мите Стајића у Београду.
- Jovanović, Dragoljub K. (1883). "Црна река". Glasnik Srpskog učenog društva. 54: 187–256.
- Karadžić, Vuk Stefanović (1898). Jovanović, Lj. (ed.). Грађа за српску историју нашега времена: и животи најзнатнијих поглавица овога времена. Štamparija Kraljeni Srbije.
- Milićević, Milan Đ. (1888). Поменик знаменитих људи у српског народа новијега доба. Издање Чупићеве задужбине.
- Nenadović, Konstantin N. (1903) [1883]. Живот и дела великог Ђорђа Петровића Кара-Ђорђа. Vol. I (2 ed.). Belgrade: Штампа Савића и Комп. – via Archive.org.
- Nenadović, Konstantin N. (1884). Живот и дела великог Ђорђа Петровића Кара-Ђорђа. Vol. II (1 ed.). Vienna: У Штампарији Јована Н. Вернаја – via Google Books.
- Pantelić, Dušan (1949). Beogradski pašaluk pred prvi srpski ustanak: 1794 - 1804. Posebna Izdanja - Srpska Akademija Nauka. Naučna Knjiga.
- Pavlović, Dragoljub M. (1990). "Учесници српских үстанака од 1804. до 1815. године из Рудничке и Пожешке нахије" [Participants aux insurrections serbes de 1804 et 1815 nés dans les nahies de Rudnik et de Požega] (PDF). Зборник радова Народног музеја у Чачку. XX: 115–131.
- Stojančević, Vladimir (1991). "Ћупријска нахија – Ресава у време Иванковачке битке 1805. године" (PDF). Balcanica. 22. Belgrade: SANU: 101–109.
- Stojančević, Vladimir (1980). Srbija u vreme prvog ustanka: 1804-1813. Narodni muzej.
