= Dragan Papazoglu =

Mercenary (??–1807)

- Born: Dragan Papazoglu; Studeno buche, Ottoman Empire
- Died: 1807
- Cause of death: Murder
- Military career
- Allegiance: Mercenary (kırcalı) for Dahije (–1804); Revolutionary Serbia (1804–07)
- Service years: 1804–1807
- Rank: bimbaša
- Nickname: Papazoglija
- Units: Alija Gušanac's unit (–1804); Veljko's unit (1804–1807)
- Conflicts: First Serbian Uprising

Dragan Papazoglu (Serbian Cyrillic: Драган Папазоглу; fl. 1804–1807), known as Papazoglija (Папазоглија), was an Ottoman Bulgarian mercenary in the kırcalı (bandit) detachment of Alija Gušanac that served the Dahije (rebel Janissaries) in the Sanjak of Smederevo up until the First Serbian Uprising when he joined the Serb rebels. He was known for his bravery and was murdered after an incursion into Bulgaria, due to either having upset Serbian-Russian relations during a truce or brought jealousy in other leading commanders.

== Life ==
Papazoglu was born in the village of Studeno buche (now in northwestern Bulgaria), the son of an Orthodox priest (hence patronymic Papazoglu, Popović, Popov, "son of the priest"). He was at first a mercenary kırcalı (bandit) in the forces of Alija Gušanac, who served the Dahije in the Sanjak of Smederevo. He left Gušanac's forces and joined the Serbian rebels, as a volunteer during the uprising against the Dahije (1804).

Following the liberation of Belgrade (December 1806), Papazoglija and Petar Džoda accompanied vojvoda Milisav Đorđević and buljubaša Hajduk Veljko in taking over Crna Reka. He became a bimbaša (major) in Crna Reka, appointed by Hajduk Veljko. Hajduk Veljko led the successful operation against ayan Süleyman of Zaječar (known as Serbian: Ћор-Солиман), with a decisive victory at Vrbovac that echoed in all of Timočka Krajina. Papazoglija participated in the battle, reportedly taunting the Turk garrison with others in the prelude.

There are differing accounts on Papazoglija's incursion to Bulgaria and subsequent death:

- Papazoglija often, as he had done before, crossed deep into Ottoman territory with a strong unit of cavalry and infantry and plundered rich Turks and killed tyrants. During a cease-fire he crossed into Ottoman territory and brought great damage, according to which the Ottomans complained to Russia. Serbian supreme commander Karađorđe received an order by the Russians to issue penalties to any who cross into Ottoman territory. Papazoglija, not respecting the order, took 300 cavalrymen and as many infantry and penetrated as far as the field of Sofia. There he killed a Turk hero in a duel, for which he was celebrated. He returned to Crna Reka with great plunder, and was a guest at Petar Džoda's, who at night during his sleep murdered him with an axe. Džoda sent Papazoglija's head to Karađorđe, who however became disappointed in Džoda for it. The news of Papazoglija's death was met with celebration among the Turks in the Sanjak of Vidin. It is alleged that Hajduk-Veljko and Petar Dobrnjac were involved in the plot.
- After the liberation of Crna Reka in 1807, he gathered a group which made it to Vitosha near Sofia, where he planned to rise up the people and liberate the area, however, he failed. They were surrounded and Papazoglija and 12 men managed to flee to Serb territory. Upon his return to the Vražogrnac trench, commanded by buljubaša Petar Džoda, he told of his intention to continue against the Turks. The locals admired him and his comrades, who were richly dressed and rode race horses (atovi), and were armed with silver flintlocks, and gold-adorned muskets and sabres. A jealous Džoda (known for his low character) ordered for his murder in the night. His men then fled after learning what happened. Papazoglija was one of the most brave in Veljko's band and always stood by Veljko's side in assaults. Veljko and Džoda hated each other and were engaged in open rivalry after 1811.
- He was killed at Krnja Jela in the Resava mountain, on orders of Hajduk-Veljko and Petar Dobrnjac due to his exceeding fame.

== See also ==
- List of Serbian Revolutionaries

== Sources ==
- Cholov, Petar Ivanov (2003). Българските въоръжени чети и отряди през ХІХ век [Bulgarian Armed Bands and Detachments in the 19th Century] (in Bulgarian). Prof. Marin Drinov Academic Publishing House. ISBN 9789544309220.
- Jovanović, Dragoljub K. (1883). "Црна река". Glasnik Srpskog učenog društva. 54: 187–256.
- Milićević, Milan (1888). Поменик знаменитих људи у српскога народа новијега доба (in Serbian). Srpska kraljevska štamparija. pp. 510–511.
- Nenadović, Konstantin N. (1884). Живот и дела великог Ђорђа Петровића Кара-Ђорђа. Vol. II (1 ed.). Vienna: У Штампарији Јована Н. Вернаја. pp. 734–735 – via Google Books.
- Nenadović, Konstantin N. (1903) [1883]. Живот и дела великог Ђорђа Петровића Кара-Ђорђа. Vol. I (2 ed.). Belgrade: Штампа Савића и Комп. – via Archive.org.
- Perović, Radoslav (1954). Прилози за историју првог српског устанка: необјављена грађа. Народна књ. pp. 38–39.
