= Jovan Stevanović =

- Born: Jovan Stevanović or Stefanović; 1777; Poreč, Sanjak of Smederevo, Ottoman Empire
- Died: 28 December 1817 (aged 39–40); Poreč, Principality of Serbia
- Children: Stefan Stefanović "Tenka" (1797–1865)
- Military career
- Allegiance: Revolutionary Serbia
- Service years: 1804–1815
- Rank: bimbaša, vojvoda (II. class)
- Nicknames: Jova Porečki, Jovo Bimbaša
- Unit: Poreč (1804–1813)
- Commands: Poreč area
- Known for: obor-knez of Poreč
- Conflicts: First Serbian Uprising

Jovan Stevanović (Serbian: Јован Стевановић; 1777−1817), known as Jova Porečki and Jovo Bimbaša, was an obor-knez (Christian rural mayor) of Poreč (Donji Milanovac area) who participated in the First Serbian Uprising (1804–13) and was promoted to bimbaša by vojvoda Milenko Stojković, the leading commander in eastern Serbia. He became vojvoda of Poreč in early 1811 when Milenko left Serbia following the feud with Karađorđe.

Jovan was born on the Poreč island in 1777. He was involved in trade and became rich. He was appointed obor-knez (or bašknez) in Poreč during Hadji Mustafa Pasha, the Vizier of the Belgrade Pashalik. He joined the First Serbian Uprising (1804–13) and fought under Milenko Stojković, the leading commander in the Požarevac nahiya, with the rank of bimbaša. He also worked as the scribe of Milenko. Jovan was described as very honorable, peaceful and respected in Poreč and by Milenko Stojković. Milenko ordered Jovan to engage in serfdom. He is mentioned in 1808 as trading in Habsburg Sremski Karlovci.

Jovan became vojvoda (of the II. class) of Poreč in early 1811 when Milenko left Serbia following the feud with Karađorđe. A total of seven vojvoda were appointed in the Požarevac nahija, including also Ivo Momirović, Živko Šljivić, Tomo Jovanović, Ilija Stošić, Paulj Matejić and Rajica. Hajduk Veljko called the newly appointed lesser commanders poulterers (kokošari).

After the fall of Kladovo and Ottoman targeting of Poreč, Stevanović was replaced by Karađorđe with Adži-Nikola Mijailović, the former bimbaša of Hajduk Veljko. After the Ottoman quelling of the uprising, Jovan and his family fled across the Danube into Austrian territory. He was with Cincar-Marko in Varadin, then moved to Temeswar where he remained until the end of 1814. He then travelled to Khotyn in Russian Bessarabia and with Karađorđe met with Russian emperor Alexander I. He returned to Serbia in July 1815 and was subsequently appointed a governor of Poreč by Prince Miloš Obrenović. He was retired in 1817 due to health issues and died on 28 December 1817.

Jovan had a son, Stefan Stefanović "Tenka", a pro-Obrenović politician. His daughter Milica married Joksa Milosavljević, the kapetan of Poreč, in 1817 and Tenka became Joksa's scribe.

== See also ==
- List of Serbian Revolutionaries

== Sources ==
- Batalaka, Lazar Arsenijević (1899). Историја српског устанка [History of the Serbian Uprising]. Vol. II. Izd. Batalakinoga fonda.
- Karadžić, Vuk Stefanović (1898). Jovanović, Lj. (ed.). Грађа за српску историју нашега времена: и животи најзнатнијих поглавица овога времена. Штампарија краљевине Србије.
- Milićević, Milan Đ. (1888). Поменик знаменитих људи у српског народа новијега доба. Издање Чупићеве задужбине. pp. 671–673.
- Nenadović, Konstantin N. (1884). Живот и дела великог Ђорђа Петровића Кара-Ђорђа. Vol. II (1 ed.). Vienna: У Штампарији Јована Н. Вернаја – via Google Books.
- Popović, Radomir J. (2003). "Исповест Стефана Стефановића Тенке". Мешовита грађа (21). Istorijski institut, Beograd: 21–40. ISSN 0350-5650.
