= Beli Potok, Sokobanja =

Beli Potok Бели Поток
- Village
- Location within Serbia
- Coordinates: 43°40′16″N 21°50′55″E
- Country: Serbia
- District: Zaječar District
- Municipality: Sokobanja

Population (2002)
  - Total: 238
- Time zone: UTC+1 (CET)
  - Summer (DST): UTC+2 (CEST)

Beli Potok is a village in the municipality of Sokobanja, Serbia. According to the 2002 census, the village has a population of 238 people.

== History ==
During the late Ottoman period, the area of Beli Potok included two chiflik mahala (neighbourhoods), one was Dživdžibare (Џивџибаре) and the other was Beli Potok. When the area was liberated, the Serbian authorities merged the two into one and the name Beli Potok stayed.

The area was a site of operations during the First Serbian Uprising. In 1806, after the takeover of Aleksinac, the Serb rebels heard that the Pasha of Niš aimed to take Aleksinac with a large army; vojvoda of Crna Reka Milisav Đorđević and vojvoda Stevan Sinđelić went from Gornja Poljanica to the gorge of Trkanja (around Bovan) to defend the area and Aleksinac from the Turks. The combined Serb forces of Milisav, Sinđelić, Petar Dobrnjac, Ilija Stošić and Paulj Matejić, numbering 800, destroyed the Turks, numbering 3,000, at Dživdžibare.

== Sources ==
- Jovanović, Dragoljub K. (1883). "Црна река". Glasnik Srpskog učenog društva. 54: 187–256.
- Protić, Kosta (1893). "Ратни догађаји из првога српског устанка под Карађорђем Петровићем 1804—1813". Годишњица Николе Чупића. XIII. Državna štamparija: 285.
