= Bovan (Aleksinac) =

Bovan Бован
- Village
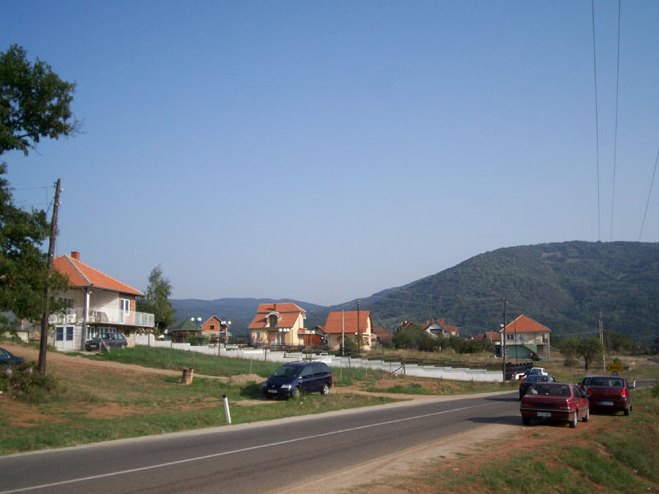
- Bovan

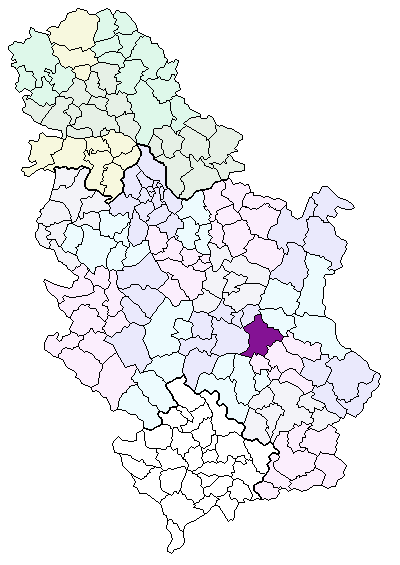
- Municipality of Aleksinac in Serbia

- Location within Serbia
- Country: Serbia
- Region: Southern and Eastern Serbia
- District: Nišava
- Municipality: Aleksinac

Population (2002)
  - Total: 554
- Time zone: UTC+1 (CET)
  - Summer (DST): UTC+2 (CEST)

Bovan (Serbian Cyrillic: Бован) is a village in Serbia situated in the municipality of Aleksinac, in the Nišava District. Bovan has a population of 554 as recorded in the 2002 census.

The village was a site of operations in the First Serbian Uprising (1804–13). In 1806, after the takeover of Aleksinac, the Serb rebels heard that the Pasha of Niš aimed to take Aleksinac with a large army; vojvoda of Crna Reka Milisav Đorđević and vojvoda Stevan Sinđelić went from Gornja Poljanica to the gorge of Trkanja (around Bovan) to defend the area and Aleksinac from the Turks. The combined Serb forces of Milisav, Sinđelić, Petar Dobrnjac, Ilija Stošić and Paulj Matejić, numbering 800, destroyed the Turks, numbering 3,000, at Dživdžibare. The Ottoman army of Niš never went for Aleksinac, while vojvoda Milisav stayed at Trkanja and monitored the Turks that trenched themselves around Sokobanja, and stopped them from entering Serb villages. Shortly afterwards, vojvoda Milisav and his Crna Reka army retreated from Trkanja to Šumadija, in order to finally take over Belgrade.

== Sources ==
- Jovanović, Dragoljub K. (1883). "Црна река". Glasnik Srpskog učenog društva. 54: 187–256.
- Nenadović, Konstantin N. (1884). Живот и дела великог Ђорђа Петровића Кара-Ђорђа. Vol. II (1 ed.). Vienna: У Штампарији Јована Н. Вернаја – via Google Books.
- Protić, Kosta (1893). "Ратни догађаји из првога српског устанка под Карађорђем Петровићем 1804—1813". Годишњица Николе Чупића. XIII. Državna štamparija.
