= Petko Vasiljević =

Major in First Serbian Uprising

Petko Vasiljević (Serbian: Петко Васиљевић; c. 1780–1809) was a Serbian captain (bimbasha) active in the Timok district during the First Serbian Uprising. He and his brother Nina Vasiljević were born in Zagrađe. They both joined the First Serbian Uprising as volunteers, when vojvoda (general) Hajduk Veljko rallied the Crna Reka nahiya in 1807. They both served Hajduk Veljko, who promoted Petko to bimbasha (captain) and Nina to village mayor (knez) in the Timok nahija. In a skirmish at Beligraći while storming the town, Petko was killed, and his brother Nina immediately took his place to lead the men.

== See also ==
- List of Serbian Revolutionaries
