= Stojan Abraš =

Serbian revolutionary

Stojan Abraš (1780–1813) was a Serbian revolutionary who participant in the First Serbian Uprising as a hajduk, boluk-bashi, bimbashi under the command of Hajduk Veljko Petrović. He is memorialized in many epic ballads in Serbia and Romania (Wallachia).

== Biography ==
He was born in Bukovče, near Negotin. Not all details of his life are known to history, but it is known that he defended Negotin from a heavy Turkish onslaught in 1813 that ended a long siege on the citadel. Karađorđe entrusted Hajduk Veljko and his three lieutenants, Stojan Abraš and Veljko's two brothers Milutin and Milko Petrović, to defend a fortified place and entrenched position on the frontier between Serbia and the Ottoman Empire.

The great battles around Negotin began in the summer of 1813 when hajduk Veljko's brother Milutin was the first to encounter the Turks who appeared near Kladovo and attacked the villagers as they were hastily engaged in carrying their valuables into the mountains. Milutin dispersed the Turks but was unable to pursue them in recapturing all the booty and prisoners they took.

On hearing of this, the leaders scoured the country while awaiting the enemy. They drove hundreds of cattle into the citadel of Negotin, and their men penetrated as far as Vidin. Near Bukovac, Stojan Abraš together with the other leaders put to flight the first Turkish troops which appeared on the Timok.

But when the Turks arrived with 18,000-strong, Abraš and Veljko and his brothers were obliged to ensconce themselves together with their men up in Negotin from where they made sorties, day after day, and night after night, keeping the besiegers constantly unease. Compared to the losses he inflicted on them, their losses were significantly less. Although with time, both the Serbs and the Turks were obliged to seek reinforcement – the Turks from the Grand Vizier and Veljko from Karađorđe and the Senate.

According to German historian Leopold Ranke, a total of more than 18,000 Turkish soldiers attacked the 3,000 Serbs defending Negotin. Stojan Abraš, Veljko and his brothers ordered the fortification of Negotin, made a trench, built towers and waited for the Turks.

The Turks were not long being unassisted, Redchep Aga, the Wallachian Prince Caradja, and the Grand Vizier himself led on a reinforcement. They made their way under cover of the night and by mining nearer and nearer to the fortification. They battered down with their cannons one tower of Negotin after another, and lastly the highest called Baba Finka, which was the residence of his commander Veljko himself. Yet Abraš and others kept fighting and when they ran out of bullets everything of lead or tin which he could find in the place he melted into balls, including coins, utensils, lamps, and kept off the enemy for a day longer. After several such onslaughts over three weeks, the expected reinforcements that the Serbs awaited never arrived.

On 20 July 1813, after more than twenty days of continuous Turkish shelling and frontal attacks, the Negotin citadel was left in ruins with dead bodies everywhere, including brave Stojan Abraš who was killed along with other leaders and all the rest of the freedom-fighters.

== Literature ==
- Српска породична енциклопедија (Serbian National Encyclopedia)

== See also ==
- List of Serbian Revolutionaries
