= Poultry (disambiguation) =

Poultry refers to domesticated birds kept by humans for their eggs, meat, or feathers.

Poultry may also refer to:

- Poultry farming
- Poultry (office), the office in a medieval household responsible for the purchase and preparation of poultry
- Poultry, London, a street in the City of London, United Kingdom
  - Poultry Compter, a former prison located on the street
