= Karanović =

Karanović (Serbian Cyrillic: Карановић) is a Serbian surname, derived from the masculine given name Karan, either derived from Turkish kara (black) or a hypocoristic of Karanfil. The name Karan is present in Serbian society from the Late Middle Ages. It is found in Serbia, Bosnia and Herzegovina, and Dalmatia (borne by Serbs in Čučevo and Kistanje). The toponym Karanovići is found as hamlet in Ovčinja. It may refer to:

- Goran Karanovic, Swiss footballer
- Mirjana Karanović, Serbian actress
- Nevena Karanović, Serbian politician
- Srđan Karanović, Serbian film director
- Pavle Tvrtković or Karanović, Serbian Orthodox priest

== See also ==
- Karanovac (disambiguation), placename

== Sources ==
- Grković, Milica (1977). Rečnik ličnih imena kod Srba. Belgrade: Vuk Karadžić.
