= Milutin Petrović =

Serbian military commander (1791–1861)

Vojvoda Milutin Petrović Era
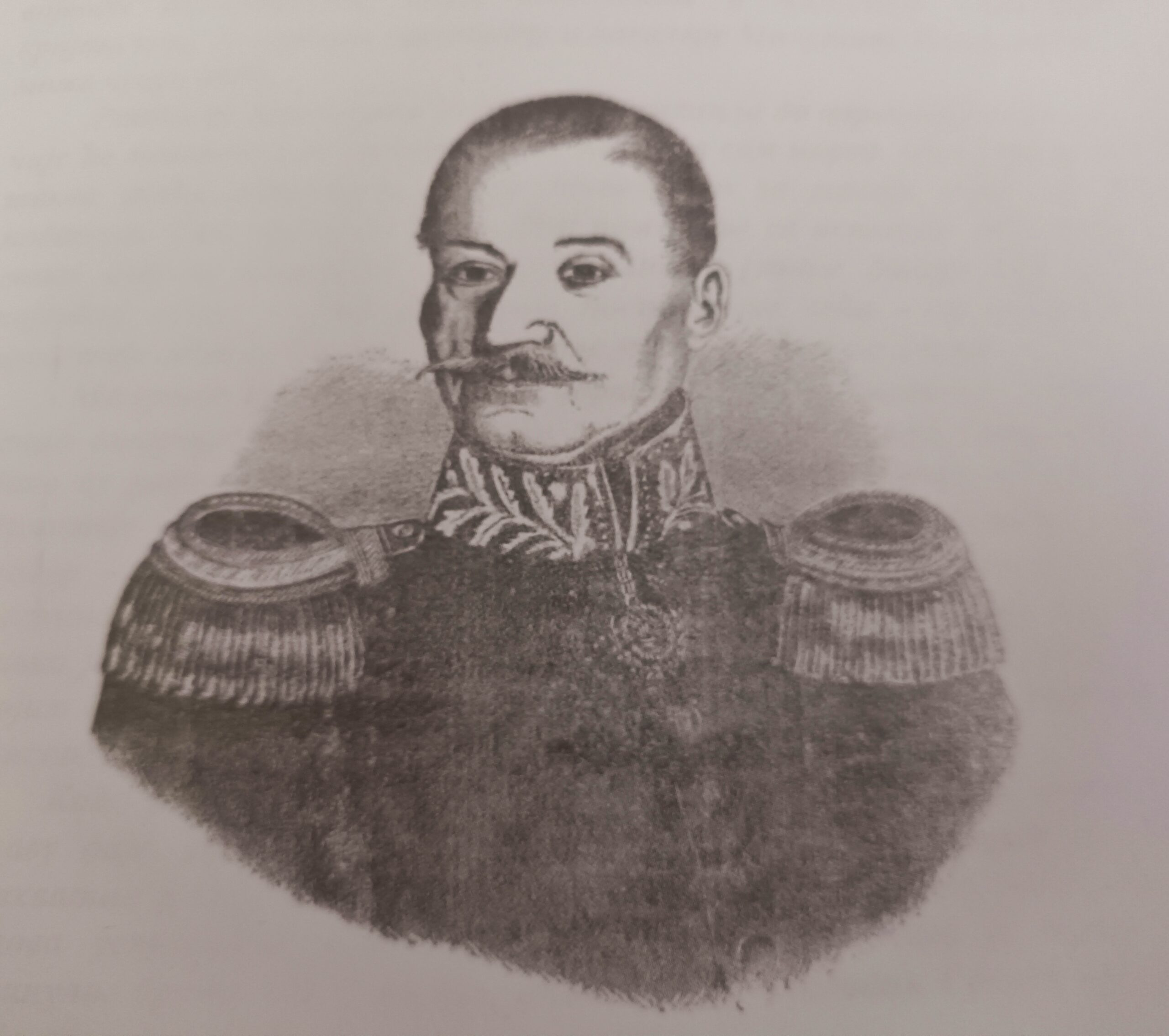
- Born: 1791; Lenovac, Zaječar, Ottoman Serbia
- Died: 21 February 1861 (aged 70); Požarevac, Principality of Serbia
- Military career
- Allegiance: Revolutionary Serbia; Principality of Serbia
- Service years: 1813–1853
- Rank: Buljubaša, Vojvoda
- Nickname: Era
- Unit: Timok Valley forces
- Conflicts: First Serbian Uprising
- Awards: Order of Glory

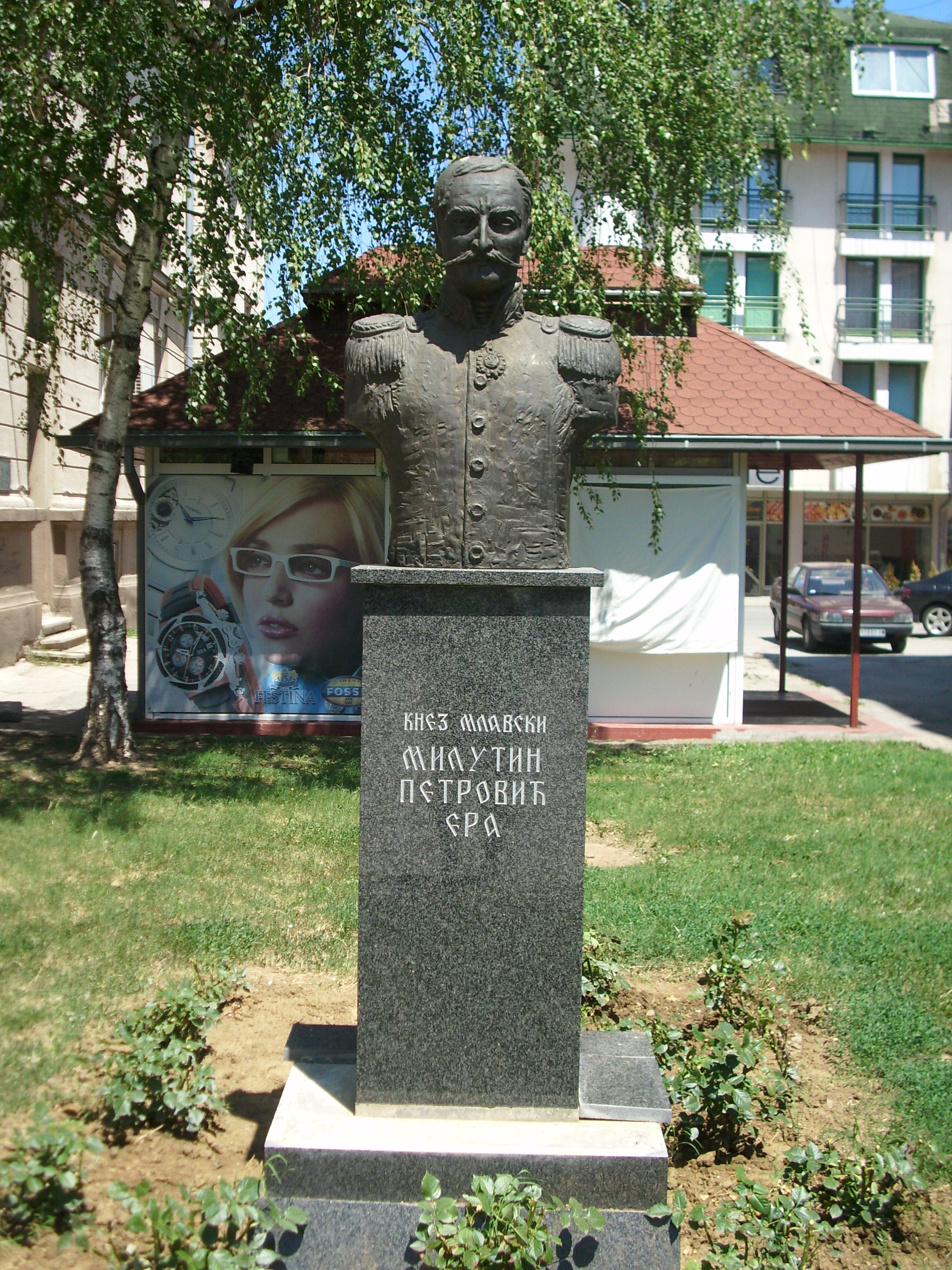
Bust of Milutin Petrovic Era, Požarevac

Milutin Petrović (Serbian pronunciation: [milǔtin pětroʋitɕ]; Serbian Cyrillic: Милутин Петровић; 1791–1861) was one of the vojvodas (military commanders) of the Serbian Revolutionary forces in the First Serbian Uprising against the Ottoman Empire, in charge of the Negotin area. His nom de guerre was Era. He and his brother Hajduk Veljko were listed as one of the heroes of the Uprising.

== See also ==
- List of Serbian Revolutionaries

== Sources ==
- Stevanović, Mihailo M. (1893). "Hajduk-Veljko i njegova braća" (in Serbian). Požarevac: Mihailo Kostić. Archived from the original on 2014-07-19.
