= Živorad Atanacković =

Serbian comic book author (1933–1998)

Živorad "Žika" Atanacković
- Живорад Атанацковић - Жика
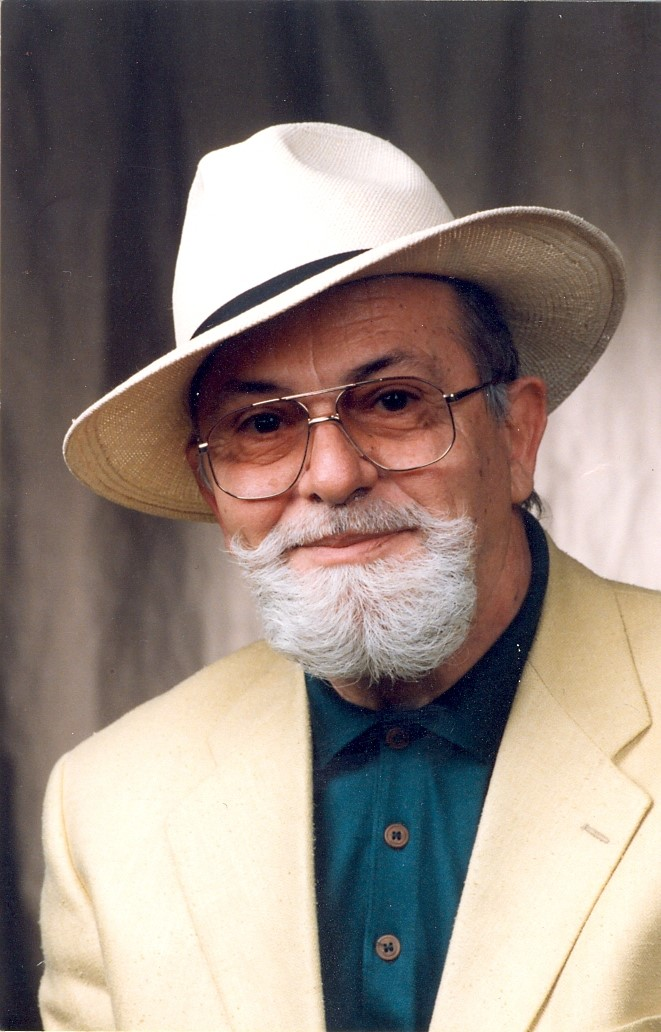
- Born: 18 June 1933; Kladovo, Morava Banovina, Kingdom of Yugoslavia (modern-day Serbia)
- Died: 19 October 1998 (aged 65); Abtsteinach, Hesse, Germany
- Notable work: Hajduk Veljko

Živorad "Žika" Atanacković (Serbian Cyrillic: Живорад Атанацковић - Жика; 18 June 1933 – 19 October 1998) was a Serbian comic book author.

The most important works in the Nikad robom edition were his series about Hajduk Veljko, and the comics "Hvalisav iz Gacko", "Pobedonosni sukob", "Devil's Command" and "Zaseda".

In that edition, he wrote the stories "Heroes from Čegar", "Traitor from Klopotnik", "Barbarian Battle", "Under the Fire of 'Fat Berties'", "The Battle by the Danube", "The Devil's Command" and "The Rebel's Son" based on his own scripts.

Based on scripts by M. Janković, he drew the comics "Blind Emperor Deljan", "Golden City", "Khanuma from Udbina", "Knights from Stubica", "Heroes from Kumanovo", "Black Horseman", "Knight of the Blue Heights", "Battle of Velbužda" and "Immortal Defense of Belgrade", and based on scripts by M. Perić, he drew the story "In the Flame of Revolt".
