= Melnica (Petrovac) =

Melnica Мелница Melnița
- Village
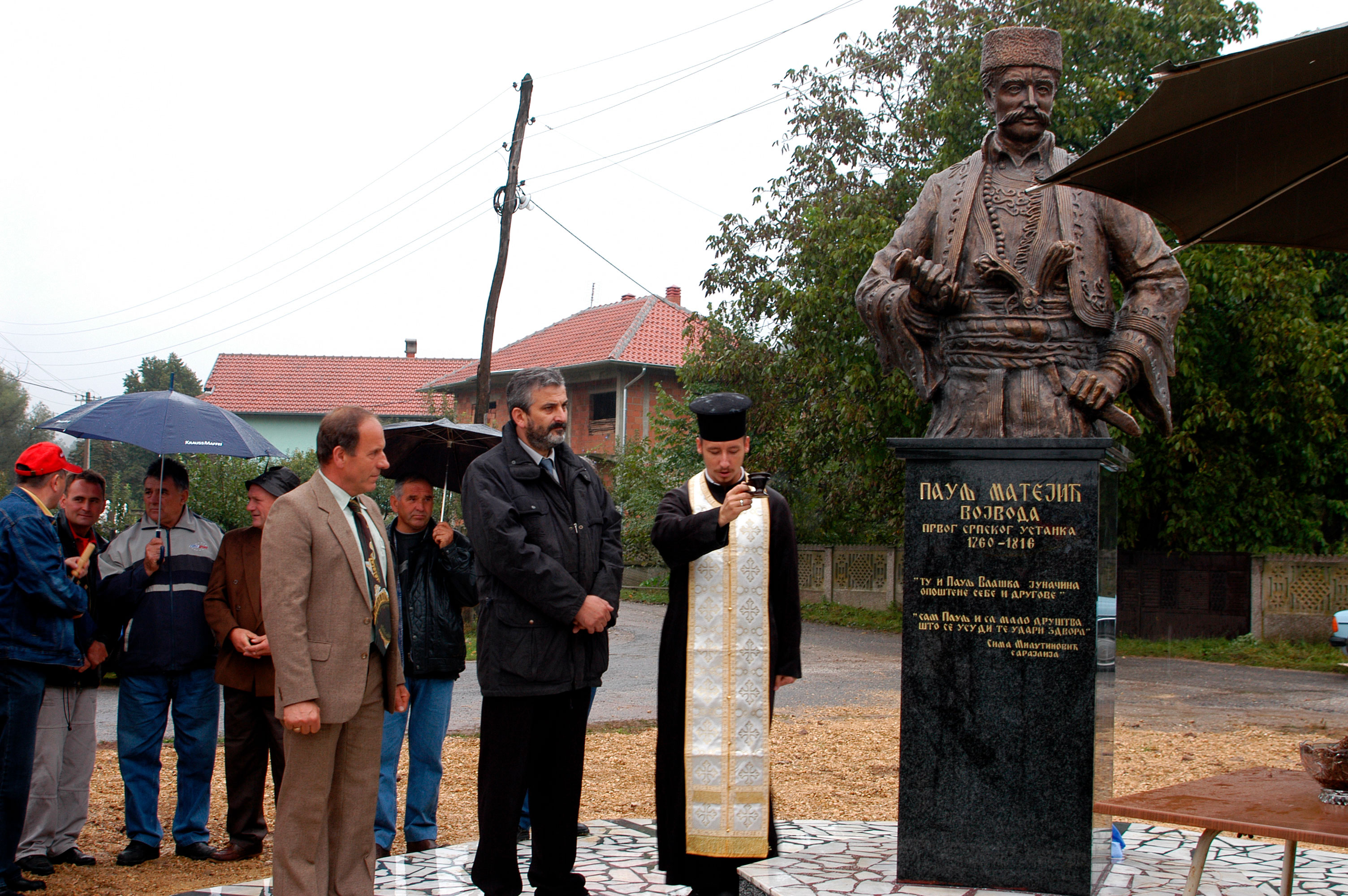
- Monument to Paulj Matejić.

- Location within Serbia
- Coordinates: 44°23′N 21°32′E
- Country: Serbia
- District: Braničevo District
- Municipality: Petrovac na Mlavi

Population (2022)
  - Total: 630
- Time zone: UTC+1 (CET)
  - Summer (DST): UTC+2 (CEST)

Melnica (Serbian: Мелница; Romanian: Melnița) is a village situated in Petrovac municipality in Serbia. It has a population of 630 inhabitants (2022 census), a plurality of them Vlachs.
