= Marinovac =

- Village
- Location within Serbia
- Coordinates: 43°44′33″N 22°12′40″E
- Country: Serbia
- District: Zaječar District
- Municipality: Zaječar

Population (2002)
  - Total: 305
- Time zone: UTC+1 (CET)
  - Summer (DST): UTC+2 (CEST)

Marinovac is a village in the municipality of Zaječar, Serbia. According to the 2002 census, the village has a population of 305 people. The village is situated in the Crna Reka region.

The village was a site of operations in the First Serbian Uprising (1804–13).

== Sources ==
- Jovanović, Dragoljub K. (1883). "Црна река". Glasnik Srpskog učenog društva. 54: 187–256.
- Protić, Kosta (1893). "Ратни догађаји из првога српског устанка под Карађорђем Петровићем 1804—1813". Годишњица Николе Чупића. XIII. Državna štamparija: 285.
