= Vrbovec (disambiguation) =

Vrbovec is a town in central Croatia.

Vrbovec may refer to:

- Vrbovec (Znojmo District), a municipality in the Czech Republic
- Vrbovec, Trebnje, a village in Slovenia
- Vrbovec, Kočevje, a village in Slovenia
- Vrbovec Samoborski, a village in Croatia

== See also ==
- Vrbovac (disambiguation)
- Vrboec
