= Vražogrnac =

- Village
- Location within Serbia
- Coordinates: 43°57′33″N 22°19′21″E
- Country: Serbia
- District: Zaječar District
- Municipality: Zaječar

Population (2002)
  - Total: 1,340
- Time zone: UTC+1 (CET)
  - Summer (DST): UTC+2 (CEST)

The Church of the Holy Trinity in Vražogrnac on the eve of the traditional folklore event "Vražogrnac Wheel" (Vražogrnački točak).

Vražogrnac is a village in the municipality of Zaječar, Serbia. According to the 2002 census, the village has a population of 1340 people. The village is situated in the Crna Reka region.

The village was a site of operations in the First Serbian Uprising (1804–13). The Crna Reka nahija was organized into Revolutionary Serbia, with a seat at Zaječar and the establishment of a magistrate (court). Eight trenches were built in the Crna Reka nahiya, one which was at Grljan. In 1807, vojvoda Petar Džoda commanded the Vražogrnac trench. In 1811, Serbian supreme commander Karađorđe divided the Crna Reka nahija into two, the Zaječar and Vražogrnac, the former under vojvoda Milisav Đorđević and the latter under Džoda.

== Sources ==
- Jovanović, Dragoljub K. (1883). "Црна река". Glasnik Srpskog učenog društva. 54: 187–256.
- Nenadović, Konstantin N. (1884). Живот и дела великог Ђорђа Петровића Кара-Ђорђа. Vol. II (1 ed.). Vienna: У Штампарији Јована Н. Вернаја – via Google Books.
- Protić, Kosta (1893). "Ратни догађаји из првога српског устанка под Карађорђем Петровићем 1804—1813". Годишњица Николе Чупића. XIII. Državna štamparija.
