= Lasovo =

- Village
- Location within Serbia
- Coordinates: 43°45′32″N 22°07′31″E
- Country: Serbia
- District: Zaječar District
- Municipality: Zaječar

Population (2015)
  - Total: 358
- Time zone: UTC+1 (CET)
  - Summer (DST): UTC+2 (CEST)

Lasovo is a village in the municipality of Zaječar, Serbia. According to the 2002 census, the village has a population of 358 people.
