= Paulj Matejić =

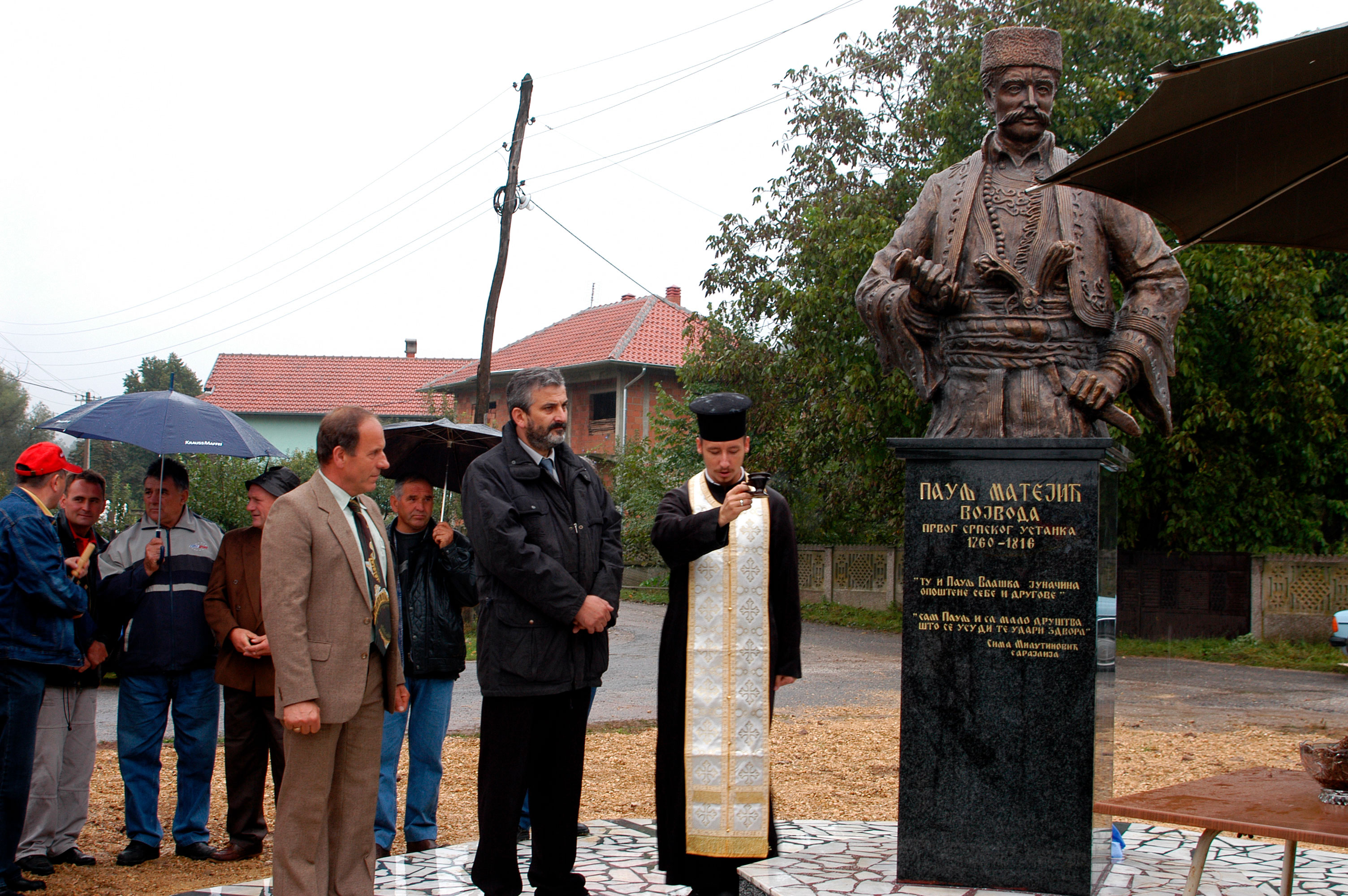
Statue of Paulj Matejić in his birth village.

Pavle Matejić (Serbian Cyrillic: Павле Матејић; c. 1770–1816), known as Paulj (Пауљ Матејић), was a Serbian Revolutionary who participated in the First Serbian Uprising (1804–13). Starting as a captain under the command of Petar Dobrnjac, Paulj was elevated to vojvoda (general) in the Gornja Mlava region upon showing his courage. He took part in the successful campaigns in the eastern parts of the Belgrade Pashaluk, and the campaign to take Niš (1809).

== Life ==
He was born in the village of Melnica, at that time part of the Požarevac nahiya in the Sanjak of Smederevo ("Belgrade Pashaluk").

He became a buljubaša (captain) already by the beginning of the uprising, appointed by Petar Dobrnjac. For his courage and other great traits, he was later appointed vojvoda (general) in Gornja Mlava. Paulj Matejić participated in the victories in the eastern parts of the Belgrade Pashaluk that strengthened rebel holding.

The combined units of Milisav Đorđević, Stevan Sinđelić, Petar Dobrnjac, Ilija Stošić and Paulj Matejić, numbering 800, destroyed the Turks commanded by Osman Pazvantoğlu, numbering 3,000, at Dživdžibare.

A rebel army led by commanders Miloje Todorović, Petar Dobrnjac, Ilija Barjaktarović, Paulj Matejić, Stevan Sinđelić and Veljko Petrović arrived on 27 April [O.S. 15 April] 1809 outside Niš. During preparations for the takeover of Niš, Paulj made a trench above the village of Kamenica. The trench, above the church, had two cannons. It was one of eleven or twelve rebel trenches around the city. On 31 May [O.S. 19 May], when the Ottomans rushed on the Čegar hill defended by Stevan Sinđelić, and vojvoda Miloje did not let anybody aid them, Paulj decided against the command and went for Čegar. Paulj did not reach in time; when the Ottomans had surrounded and overtook Sinđelić's trench, he decided to blow up the gunpowder magazine and kill everyone on the hill. Paulj and his small unit were defeated and forced to retreat, as others, to Deligrad. He mostly stayed in Deligrad after this. The Serbian Ruling Council appointed Paulj the first permanent commander of Gurgusovac (Knjaževac) after the Treaty of Bucharest (1812).

In the 1812–13 Protocol of Karađorđe, there are ten numbers written for Paulj. In 1813, he fled to the Habsburg monarchy, while the Austrians sent him to stay in Leoben for a time. He returned to Serbia in 1815, and died in his home village.

He begged for the hand of the daughter of Momir of Lučica for his son Budimir, and they married.

== Legacy ==
There is a Serbian cultural association named after him. A statue of his was erected in his home village Melnica in 2004. A water mill in his ownership is today a recognized cultural monument.

== See also ==
- List of Serbian Revolutionaries

== Sources ==
- Milićević, Milan (1888). Поменик знаменитих људи у српскога народа новијега доба (in Serbian). Srpska kraljevska štamparija. pp. 331–332.
- Mirčetić, Dragoljub (1994). Vojna istorija Niša. Vol. 2. Prosveta. pp. 52, 61, 68.
- Nenadović, Konstantin N. (1903). Život i dela velikog Đorđa Petrovića Kara-Đorđa Vrhovnog Vožda, oslobodioca i Vladara Srbije i život njegovi Vojvoda i junaka: Kao gradivo za Srbsku Istoriju od godine 1804 do 1813 i na dalje (in Serbian). Sloboda.
- Perović, Radoslav (1954). Прилози за историју првог српског устанка: необјављена грађа. Народна књ. pp. 102, 105.
- Protić, Kosta (1893). Ратни догађаји из првога српског устанка под Карађорђем Петровићем 1804—1813 [Wartime Events of the First Serbian Uprising under Karađorđe Petrović (1804–1813)]. Годишњица Николе Чупића (Nikola Čupić's Annual) (in Serbian). XIII. Državna štamparija.
- Ristić, Milovan (1911). Boj na Kamenici 19 maja 1809 godine: sinteza istoriskog izvornog gradiva o ovom događaju (in Serbian). Beograd: Štamp. "Dositije Obradović".
- Stojančević, Vladimir (2004). Srbija i srpski narod u vreme prvog ustanka. Matica srpska. pp. 37, 121, 123. ISBN 9788683651412.
- Stojančević, Vladimir (1983). Iz istorijske prošlosti istočne Srbije: (1804-1833). Istorijski arhiv "Timočka krajina". p. 40.
