= Crna Reka (region) =

Region in eastern Serbia

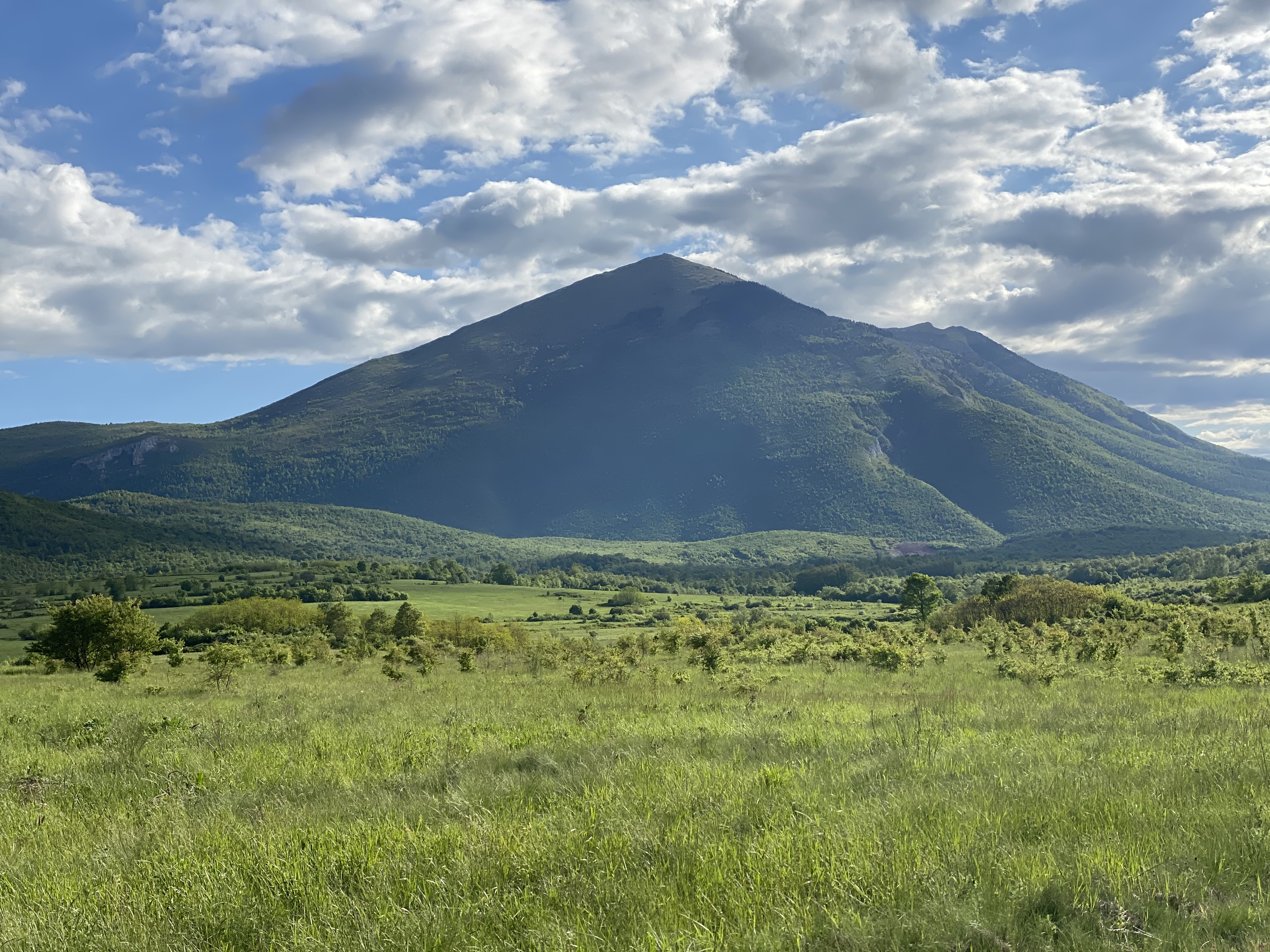
View of Rtanj.

Crna Reka (Serbian Cyrillic: Црна Река) or Crnorečje (Црноречје), meaning "Black River", is a region in eastern Serbia, comprising the historical Crna Reka nahiya (Црноречка нахија) and Crna Reka okrug, delineated by the mountains of Samanjac and Kučaj in the west and northwest, Crni Vrh, Veliki Krš, Stol and Deli Jovan in the north, Stara Planina in the east and Tupižnica and Rtanj in the south. Today, the toponym Crnorečje is more often used for the upper- and mid-course of the Crni Timok river. It includes the cities of Bor, Zaječar, and the municipality of Boljevac.

== History ==
=== 15th–16th centuries ===
In the defter of 1455, the Sanjak of Vidin was made up of four nahiye, those of Vidin, Belogradchik, Svrljig and Banja. The Crna Reka region (made up of Crna Reka, Klivje, Vinišnica) belonged to the Vidin nahiya. The Crna Reka nahiya was formed in 1530 by uniting Crna Reka, Klivje, Vinišnica and removing them from the Vidin nahiya. Klivje and Vinišnica subsequently disappeared from usage. In the 15th-16th centuries the largest settlements in the Crna Reka nahiya were Slatina, Bučje, Ržana, Kobilje, Crkvište, Zlaće, Srmlan, Banjica, Crni Dol, Kuzmino, Drmnik, Oblak, Stopanja, Jablanovik, Porodim, Savinac, Gornja Lubnica, Gornja Grabovnica, Relov Dol, Cerovnica, Snetina, Potpegalce, Zaječar, Grlište and others.

=== Late Ottoman period ===
In the 1790s, the area was included in the Pashalik of Vidin under the rule of Osman Pazvantoglu. It is said that Pazvantoglu did not allow atrocities against the population and treated them good. In 1805 Pazvantoglu appointed affluent merchant Milisav Đorđević the obor-knez of the Crna Reka nahiya. Despite Pazvantoglu's good holding towards the Christians in his pashalik, Milisav Đorđević and his friend, priest Radosav from Planinica, joined the Serbian uprising, which would be important for the later operations in Crna Reka. The uprising that broke out in Crna Reka after Easter 1805 was paused after fearing Pazvantoglu's power and support from Šumadija never came; Pazvantoglu amnestied the local rebels and Crna Reka was left untouched by Ottoman troops. The Serb rebels however continued, and sent people into Crna Reka that gathered hundreds and worked primarily on fortification of defensive positions. Hajduk bands made incursions into Timočka Krajina. After hearing that Hafiz Mustafa Pasha set out from Niš, an army was mustered, including also Crna Reka rebels under Milisav, that fought and decisively won the Ottoman army at the Ivankovac field (18 August [O.S. 7 August] 1805). On 14 January 1806, Milisav was ordered to support Resavac in taking over Paraćin, Ražanj and Aleksinac, while Mladen Milovanović was sent to accompany vojvoda Jovan Jakovljević of Levač towards Kruševac. After taking over Aleksinac, Milisav was tasked with defending the area from troops from the Sanjak of Vidin.

The Crna Reka nahija was organized into Revolutionary Serbia, with a seat at Zaječar and the establishment of a magistrate (court). Eight trenches were built, at Vražogrnac, Grljan, Sumrakovac, Kalafat, Kijak, Jame.

=== Modern Serbia ===
Crna Reka remained outside the Principality of Serbia following the Second Serbian Uprising (1815), but was finally transferred by the Ottoman sultan to Serbia in 1833 along with five other Serb nahiyas. In 1834 the administrative reorganization saw Crna Reka established as an okrug (district) part of the Timok serdarstvo (governorship). In 1866, the Crna Reka okrug had 3 srezovi, 45 settlements, and 53,284 inhabitants.

== Population ==
The population of Crna Reka is of several ethnographic group origins, such as the Dinaric, Kosovo-Metohija, Morava-Vardar and Timok-Braničevo migrational routes, that settled in the Ottoman period. There were also immigrants from Wallachia. Only the valley of Grliška reka include natives predating the migrations (Grlište, Gornja Bela Reka and Leskovac).

== Notable people ==
- Milisav Đorđević (fl. 1804–15), Serbian revolutionary
- Radosav (fl. 1804–15), Serbian revolutionary
- Petar Džoda (1770–1813), Serbian revolutionary

== Sources ==
- Jovanović, Dragoljub K. (1883). "Црна река". Glasnik Srpskog učenog društva. 54: 187–256.
- Milićević, Milan Đ. (1876). Кнежевина Србија: географија, орографија, хидрографија, топографија, аркеологија, историја, етнографија, статистика, просвета, култура, управа [Principality of Serbia]. U državnoj štampariji – via Google Books.
- Nenadović, Konstantin N. (1884). Живот и дела великог Ђорђа Петровића Кара-Ђорђа. Vol. II (1 ed.). Vienna: У Штампарији Јована Н. Вернаја – via Google Books.
- Protić, Kosta (1893). "Ратни догађаји из првога српског устанка под Карађорђем Петровићем 1804—1813". Годишњица Николе Чупића. XIII. Državna štamparija.
- Bojanić-Lukač, Dušanka (1978), "Zaječar i Crna Reka od XV do XVIII veka" [Zaječar and Crna Reka from the 15th to the 18th century], Bulletin of the Ethnographic Museum in Belgrade (in Serbian), no. 42, Beograd: Etnografski muzej
- Kostić, Mihajlo (1974), "Poreklo i kompozicija stanovništva u selima istočne Srbije" [Origin and composition of the population in the villages of eastern Serbia] (PDF), Proceedings of the Geographical Institute "Jovan Cvijić" (in Serbian), Beograd
