= Brestovac, Bor =

Brestovac Брестовац
- Village
- Location within Serbia
- Coordinates: 44°02′24″N 22°04′59″E
- Country: Serbia
- District: Bor District
- Municipality: Bor

Population (2022)
  - Total: 2,594
- Time zone: UTC+1 (CET)
  - Summer (DST): UTC+2 (CEST)

Brestovac (Serbian Cyrillic: Брестовац) is a village in the municipality of Bor, Serbia. According to the 2022 census, the village has a population of 2,594 people.

== See also ==
- Populated places of Serbia
