= Grlište =

- Village
- Location within Serbia
- Coordinates: 43°48′N 22°15′E
- Country: Serbia
- District: Zaječar District
- Municipality: Zaječar

Population (2002)
  - Total: 857
- Time zone: UTC+1 (CET)
  - Summer (DST): UTC+2 (CEST)

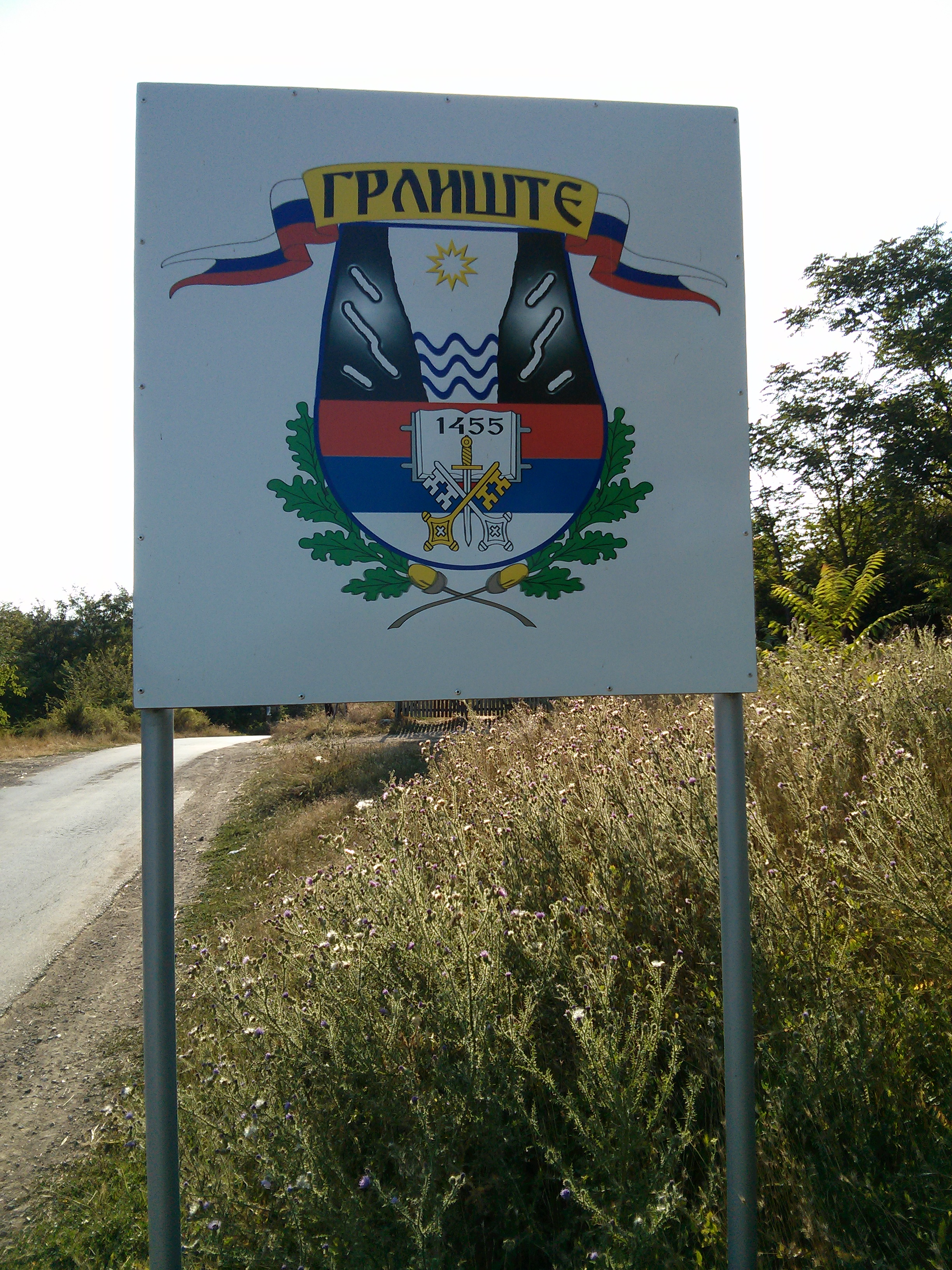
Board when entering Grlište

Grlište is a village in the municipality of Zaječar, Serbia. According to the 2002 census, the village has a population of 857 people.
