= Gornji Ljubeš =

- Village
- Location within Serbia
- Coordinates: 43°34′03″N 21°35′35″E
- Country: Serbia
- District: Nišava
- Municipality: Aleksinac

Population (2002)
  - Total: 240
- Time zone: UTC+1 (CET)
  - Summer (DST): UTC+2 (CEST)

Gornji Ljubeš (Serbian: Горњи Љубеш) is a village in the municipality of Aleksinac, Serbia. According to the 2002 census, the village has a population of 240 people.

== See also ==
- List of populated places in Serbia
