= Binbashi =

Turkish army rank

Binbaşı shoulder mark of modern-day Turkish Armed Forces

A binbashi, alternatively bimbashi, (from Turkish: Binbaşı, "chief of a thousand", "chiliarch") is a major in the Turkish army, of which term originated in the Ottoman army. The title was also used for a major in the Khedivial Egyptian army as Bimbashi (1805–1953). It was also used by the Serbian revolutionaries as Bimbaša (Serbian Cyrillic: Бимбаша) in 1804–1817.

The collar mark (later shoulder mark) and cap (until 1933) of a Binbaşı had two stripes and one star during the early years of the Turkish Republic.

== See also ==
- Military of the Ottoman Empire
- Turkish Army
