= Karanovac =

Karanovac (Serbian Cyrillic: Карановац) is a Serbo-Croatian toponym, derived from masculine given name Karan. It may refer to:

- Karanovac, Petrovo, Bosnia and Herzegovina
- Karanovac, Varvarin, Serbia
- Old name for Kraljevo, Serbia

== See also ==
- Karanović, surname
