= Prečani (Serbs) =

Serbian blanket term

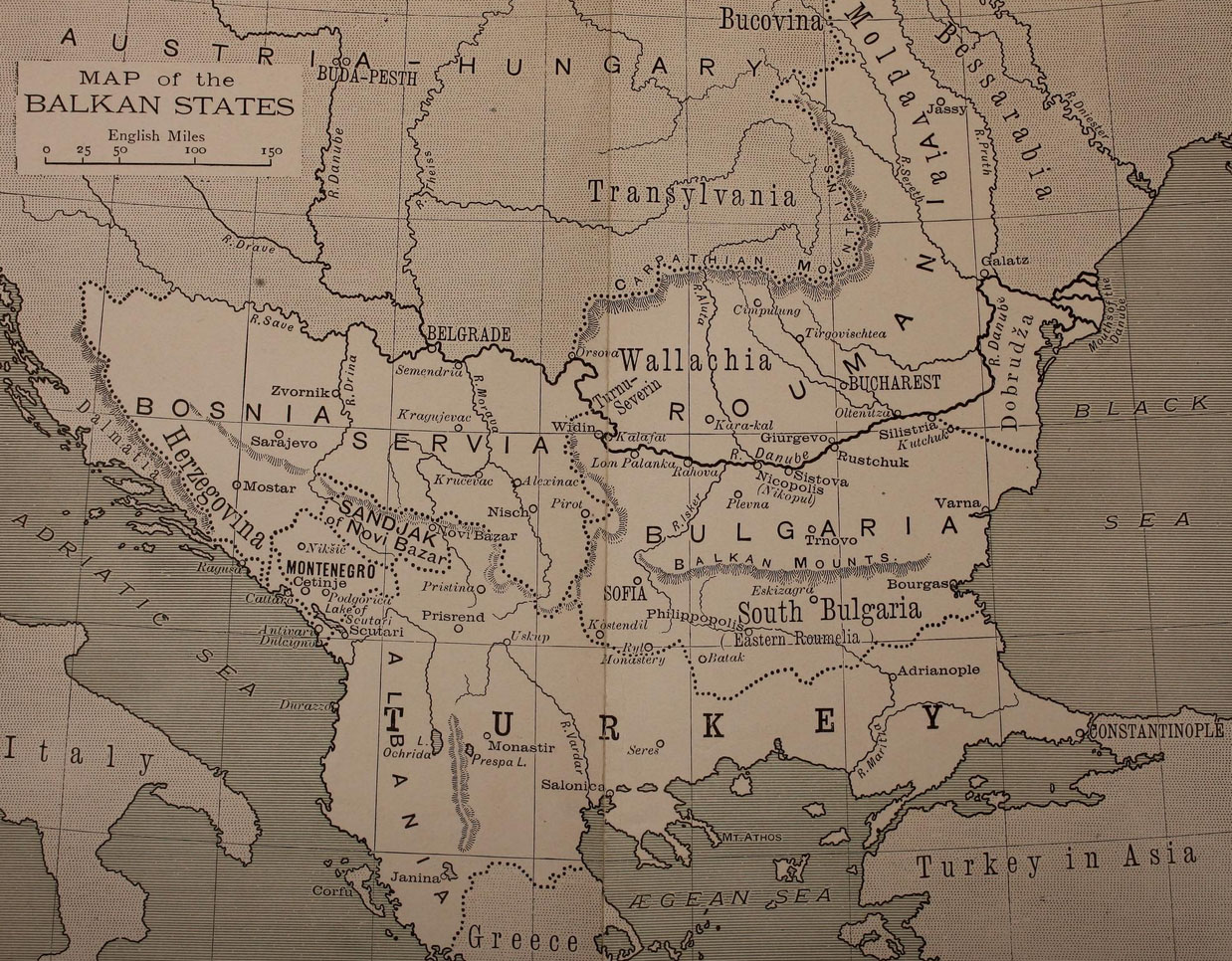
Map of the Balkan states, 1896

Prečani (Serbian Cyrillic: Пречани) was a Serbian blanket term used at the end of the 19th- and early 20th century for ethnic Serb communities located preko ("across") the Drina, Sava and Danube rivers, beyond the western and northern borders of the Principality of Serbia and later Kingdom of Serbia, that is, in Austria-Hungary-held Vojvodina, Bosnia and Herzegovina and Croatia. It was thus used to distinguish Serbs of Serbia, Srbijanci ("Serbians") from those in the Austria-Hungary; it was not applied to the Serbs of Montenegro or those in the Ottoman Empire.

In the Habsburg lands – in Kingdom of Dalmatia, the Serbs established the Serb People's Party, while in the Kingdom of Croatia-Slavonia they established the Serb Independent Party. In 1918 the Prečani Serbs formed a notable political constituency that participated in the founding of the State of Slovenes, Croats and Serbs as well as the joining of Banat, Bačka and Baranja with the Kingdom of Serbia. In the first Yugoslavia, their political party, the Independent Democratic Party was important in national politics. After the invasion of Yugoslavia, they were the main target of the World War II persecution of Serbs.

The term was primarily used in the Principality/Kingdom of Serbia and was not used by the Austro-Hungarian Serbs themselves.

== Legacy ==
During the Yugoslav Wars, two groups of former Prečani established self-proclaimed Republic of Serbian Krajina in Croatia and Republika Srpska in Bosnia and Herzegovina, and they circulated but never implemented the idea of unification of the two unrecognized entities. Local authorities in the exclave of SAO Eastern Slavonia, Baranja and Western Syrmia rejected unification proposals claiming it will deepen the crisis.

There are occasionally still references to the term Prečani with regard to the Serbs of Bosnia and Herzegovina, Croatia and Vojvodina.

In a 2015 interview with the Croatian Serb magazine Novosti, Darko Suvin mentioned it in modern-day context. A 2023 article in the Serbian political magazine NIN mentions it in the context of the Vojvodina Autonomist Movement. In a 2025 speech, Bosnian Serb politician Milorad Dodik rejected the label together with all other regional labels for the Serbs.

== Annotations ==
1. In Serbian, the terms Srbi Prečani (Срби пречани) and prečanski Srbi (пречански Срби) were used. Another term used was "Austrian Serbs" (austrijski Srbi/аустријски Срби).

== See also ==
- Rascians
