= Vrbovac =

Vrbovac may refer to:

Bosnia and Herzegovina

- Vrbovac, Bosnia and Herzegovina, a village

Croatia

- Vrbovac, Croatia, a village near Daruvar

Kosovo

- Vrbovac, Kosovo, a village in Klokot municipality

Serbia

- Vrbovac (Blace), a village
- Vrbovac (Boljevac), a village
- Vrbovac (Smederevo), a village
- Vrbovac (Sokobanja), a village

== See also ==
- Vrbovec (disambiguation)
