= Tupižnica =

Mountain in Serbia

- Location within Serbia

Highest point
- Elevation: 1,162 m (3,812 ft)
- Coordinates: 43°42′11″N 22°09′06″E

Geography
- Location: Eastern Serbia
- Parent range: Carpathian Mountains

Tupižnica (Serbian Cyrillic: Тупижница, pronounced [tǔpiʒnitsa]) is a mountain in eastern Serbia, between the towns of Boljevac, Zaječar and Knjaževac. Its highest peaks, Bučanski kamen and Glogovački vrh, have an elevation of 1,160 m and 1,162 m, respectively.

Tupižnica is prominent, surrounded by valleys. It mostly consists of a large karst plateau. It is remote and uninhabited, especially its vast forested northern parts, towards the villages of Gornja Bela Reka and Lenovac in Zaječar municipality. Even the traditional activities of nomadic sheep-breeding and hunting have died out in the last decades.

There is a communication tower at the ridge of the southern peak of Bučanski kamen, overlooking the village of Bučje.

Like nearby Rtanj, Tupižnica is noted for its numerous Lilac trees.

== See also ==
- List of mountains in Serbia
