= Poultry (office) =

Medieval profession

A poultry was the office in a medieval household responsible for the purchase and preparation of poultry, as well as the room in which the poultry was stored.This use of the word is largely obsolete today.

== Structure ==
It was headed by a poulter or poulterer (though this last term is more often for a merchant who deals in poultry). The office was subordinated to the kitchen, and only existed as a separate office in larger households. It was closely connected with other offices of the kitchen, such as the larder and the saucery.

== See also ==
- Chicken as food
