= Kırcalı =

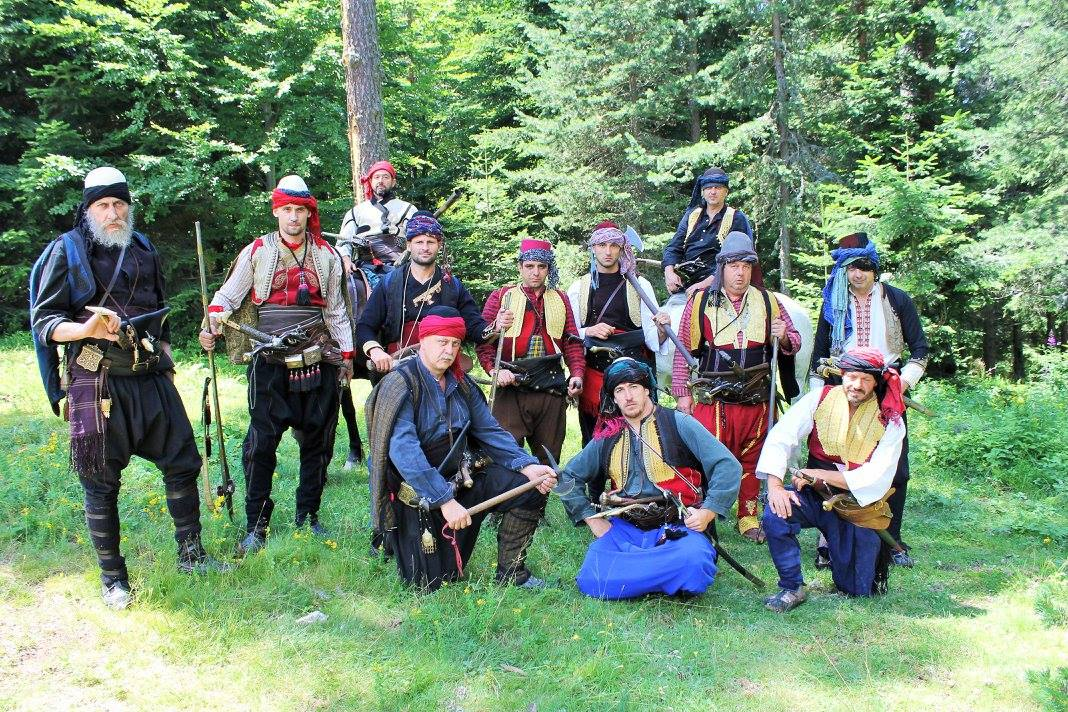
A Kirdzhali reenactment band in Bulgaria.

The kırcalı or kirdzhali (Turkish: kırcalı, from Ottoman Turkish: قیر, romanized: kır meaning "mountain", Bulgarian: кърджалии, Serbian: крџалије, krdžalije) is a term used for a type of bandits, brigands and rebels active in the Balkans at the end of the 18th- and beginning of 19th century, in the prelude of national revolutions and liberation of Bulgarians, Greeks and Serbs. According to some the name is derived from the town of Kardzhali in the Rhodopes, one of the important retreats of "mountain bandits" (dağlı eşkıyası) that emerged after the Ottoman Empire lost territory by the Black Sea and made Rumelia a borderland filled with refugees and former frontiersmen. The kırcalı was a new type of banditry that was registered from 1785, denoting outlaws that were mostly professional soldiers, but had local Muslims and non-Muslims in their ranks. They differed from brigands who robbed on the highway, and instead plundered and destroyed villages, towns and cities, indiscriminately killing. They were directed against the political order and were involved in the ayan infighting and rebellions against the Porte. The Porte also used the kırcalı in war-time, sanctioning violence against Christians.

They were active during the Russo-Turkish War (1787–1792), Austro-Turkish War (1788–1791), Serbian Revolution (1804–17), Russo-Turkish War (1806–1812) and Ottoman coups of 1807–1808.

== See also ==
- Osman Pazvantoğlu
- Hajduks
- Armatoles

== Sources ==
- Bumann, Ninja; Jobst, Kerstin S.; Rohdewald, Stefan; Troebst, Stefan (2024-12-30). Handbook on the History and Culture of the Black Sea Region. Walter de Gruyter GmbH & Co KG. ISBN 978-3-11-072321-2.
- Fleet, Kate; Faroqhi, Suraiya N.; Kasaba, Reşat (2006). The Cambridge History of Turkey. Cambridge University Press. ISBN 978-0-521-62095-6.
