= Ilija Barjaktarović =

Serbian voivode (1771–1828)

- Илија Барјактаровић
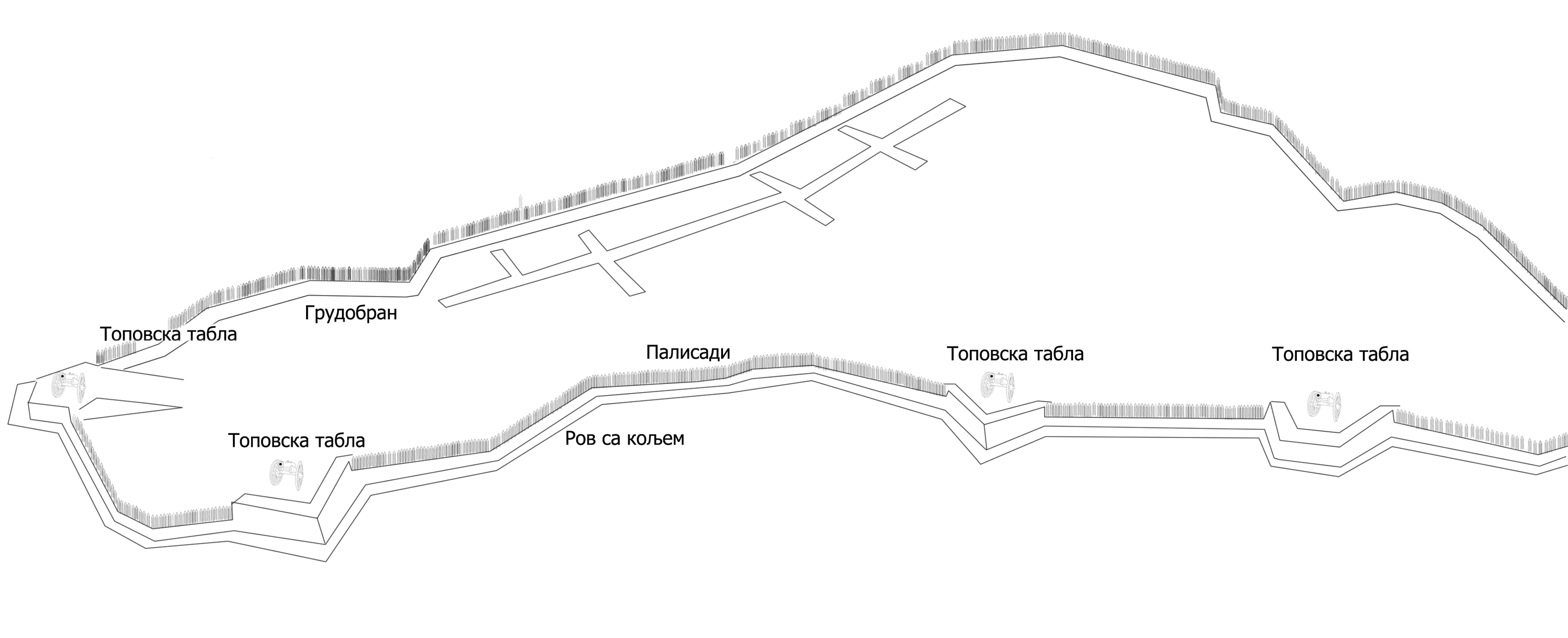
- The triangular redoubt of Barjaktarević which was successfully defended by the Serbian rebel army during the Battle of Deligrad (1806)
- Born: Ilija Barjaktarović c. 1771; Izvor, Paraćin nahiya, Sanjak of Niš
- Died: spring 1828; Svilajnac, Ćuprija nahija, Principality of Serbia
- Other names: Barjaktarević, Deda Ilija
- Children: Sava and Radovan
- Military career
- Allegiance: Revolutionary Serbia
- Service years: 1804–13
- Rank: vojvoda
- Units: Paraćin nahija Deligrad
- Commands: Deligrad (1809–13)

Ilija Barjaktarović (Serbian: Илија Барјактаровић; 1771–spring 1828) was a Serbian vojvoda (commander) in the First Serbian Uprising (1804–13), notably serving as commander at Deligrad (1809–13).

Barjaktarović was born in c. 1771 in the village of Izvor in the Paraćin nahiya. He was a respected and successful merchant and associate of leader Karađorđe before joining the uprising. Karađorđe informed Mitesser about the defeat of Turks at Batočina and Jagodina in a letter dated 16 April 1804. Karađorđe then defeated Kučuk-Alija at Paraćin, resulting in the expansion of uprising in that area, under Barjaktarević.

Older historiography claimed that Barjaktarović first joined in 1805; following the Serbian victory at Ivankovac (18 August 1805) under the command of bimbaša Milenko Stojković, the Ottoman troops retreated to Paraćin. Karađorđe, Stojković and other leaders went to Izvor and asked Barjaktarović to join the uprising and he gathered 200 men the next day. He was shortly afterwards appointed the vojvoda of Paraćin.

Among Barjaktarović's leading men were knez Veljko from Paraćin and buljubaša Šunda. In the period of 1809–13 he was most often garrisoned at Deligrad. As the commander of Deligrad and holder of the Constantinople Road and the area towards Niš, Barjaktarović was the intermediate of diplomatic missions.

Following the retreat from Deligrad in 1813, Barjaktarović was in exile in the Habsburg Monarchy and then returned to Serbia in 1815. New Serbian leader Miloš Obrenović appointed him a member of the magistrate of the Ćuprija nahija in Svilajnac. He was among the signatories of the "people's act" to knez Miloš dated 17 January 1827.

Barjaktarović died in springtime 1828 and was buried at the Svilajnac church.

Barjaktarović had military prowess as well as judicial, administrative and diplomatic capabilities. He was described as small, chubby, hairy, brown-haired and dark-eyed. He survived his two sons, Sava to smallpox and Radovan was poisoned, due to which he grieved and wore a long beard. He was called Deda Ilija (grandpa) due to his calm nature.

== See also ==
- List of Serbian Revolutionaries
- Timeline of the Serbian Revolution

== Sources ==
- Jovanović, Dobrivoje (2014). "ПРВЕ БОРБЕ СА ТУРЦИМА И ОСЛОБОЂЕЊЕ ЈАГОДИНЕ" (PDF). Прошлост. 3. ISBN 978-86-914023-7-2.
- Milićević, Milan Đ. (1888). Поменик знаменитих људи у српског народа новијега доба. Издање Чупићеве задужбине. pp. 27–29.
