= Brusnik, Zaječar =

Brusnik Брусник
- Village (former small town)
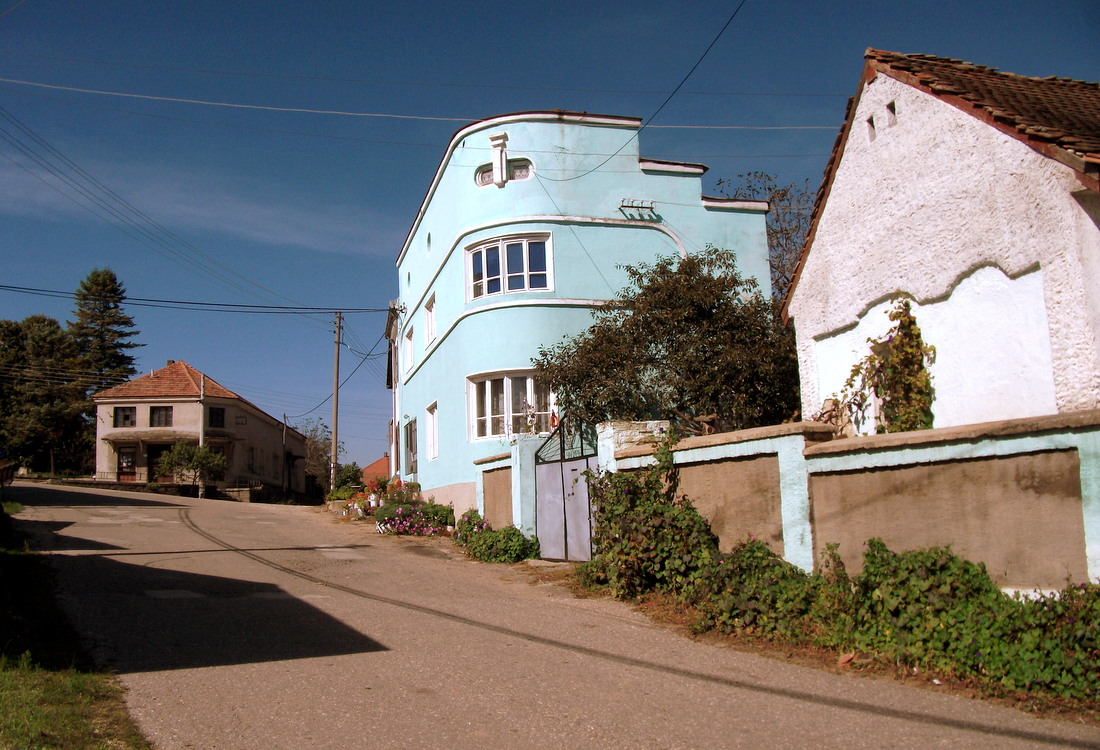

- Location within Serbia
- Coordinates: 44°06′11″N 22°26′17″E
- Country: Serbia
- Regions: Eastern Serbia
- District: Zaječar
- Municipality: Zaječar
- Elevation: 140 m (460 ft)

Population (2002)
  - Total: 456
- Time zone: UTC+1 (CET)
  - Summer (DST): UTC+2 (CEST)
- Postal code: 19313
- Area code: (+381) (0)19

Brusnik (Serbian Cyrillic: Брусник) is a village situated in the Zaječar municipality of the Republic of Serbia (formerly briefly in Negotin District, as it is 37 km (23 mi) from Zaječar and 21 km (13 mi) from Negotin, which is somewhat similar to the locations of the town of Negotino and the village Brusnik in Macedonia).

Located roughly halfway between the end points of Prahovo-Zaječar railway line, it is the sole major railway junction on it.

Like many other villages in Eastern Serbia, specifically the Timok Valley region, Brusnik has "pivnice"/"pimnice", a separate but attached set of temporary residences, aligned in streets and with shops, but not a school, post office or medical facilities (which remain only in the village itself), located five km away from the village proper and used for a month or so during the grape harvesting and wine making season.

Due to their exceptional quality, Brusnik wines were exported to the paramount centre of winemaking, France, as early as the mid-19th century, but today with a sharp decline in population and after the devastating effects of mismanagement during Josip Broz Tito's socialism, Slobodan Milosevic's nationalism, and NATO's illegal destruction of Serbia's infrastructure in 1999 during the Kosovo war, Brusnik's wineries—and economy overall—is devastated (not unlike that in a greater part of Serbia's countryside).

== History ==
Identified on Austrian maps in the early 18th century as a part of the Banat of Temeswar and listed in the Ottoman Turkish censuses already in the late 16th and throughout the 17th century, and then again immediately after Ottoman reconquest of Eastern Serbia from Austrian Empire in 1741, Brusnik has been the municipal centre for the adjacent villages Tabakovac (mostly Vlach/Wallachian population) and Klenovac (mostly Serbian population, who moved to the region in the 16th century, originally from the Kosovo and Metohija area and Montenegro) since 1833, when it became a part of the Principality of Serbia.

After it got the official status of a "small market town" ("varošica") in 1918, for a time it was also the municipal centre for Rečka, but the town status was rescinded after WWII when the new Communist government strongly favoured pauperised "workers" whom, after removed from their rural background to developing towns, it expected to be loyal, over mostly independent rural farmers, whom it before 1950 referred to under the Soviet term of "kulaks". Then after the Tito–Stalin split things changed, and for a few years in the 1950s Brusnik was officially a town again and the seat of the Krajina District composed of over 15 villages, but again, this did not last, as Negotin and especially Zaječar as administrative, cultural, and industrial centres were promulgated by the polity and Brusnik was once again demoted to the status of a village.

== Demographics ==
Historical population
Year	Pop.	±% p.a.
1948	1,398	—
1953	1,432	+0.48%
1961	1,350	−0.73%
1971	1,076	−2.24%
1981	846	−2.38%
1991	569	−3.89%
2002	486	−1.42%
2011	411	−1.85%

== Communal Spirit Endeavours ==
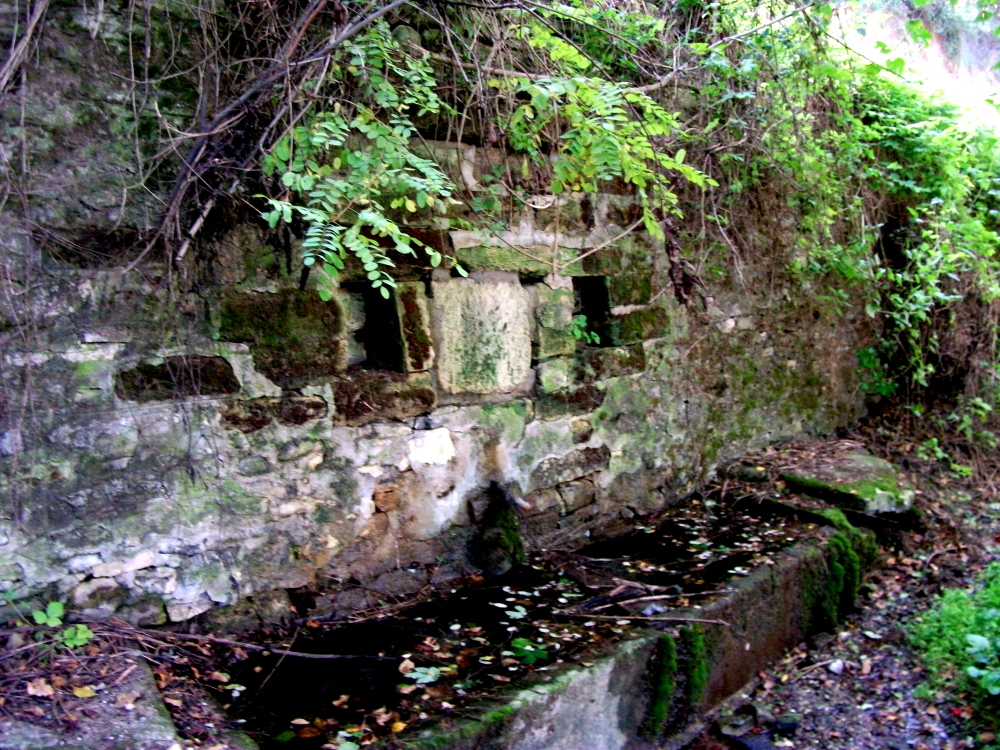
Mita's Fountain, cca. 1900

There are a dozen public fountains in, and on the outskirts of, the village, built between mid-19th and mid-20th centuries. One of the bigger ones is Mita's Fountain (Mitina česma), built at the turn of 19th/20th century by the local merchant Mita Kojić.

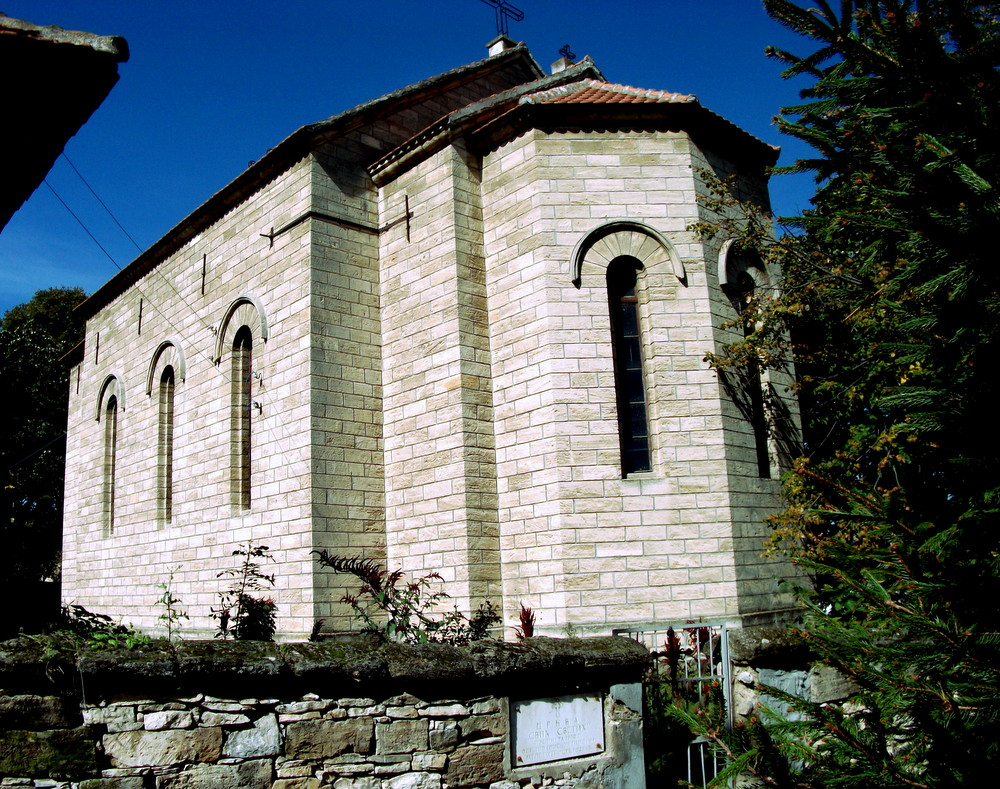
Brusnik All Saints' church, built 1897–1900, consecrated 1900

The Brusnik parish church was built in 1897–1900, and consecrated to All Saints (a rather unusual feast day for a small town church, usually reserved for secondary cathedrals and basilicas in large bishopric cities) in 1900, by Serbian Orthodox Church Bishop Melentije Vujić of the Timok Eparchy.

Already in 1925, in one of the first such undertakings in the Kingdom of Serbs, Croats and Slovenes, Brusnik had a community based health insurance scheme for Brusnik itself, as well as for Klenovac, Tabakovac, Tamnič, Rečka, Metriš, Veliki Jasenovac, Velika Jasikova and Braćevac, centred in Brusnik, due to the enthusiasm of its local school head teacher and activist, Dušan Jeremić.
