= Cămașa ciumei =

Apotropaic one-day textile rite in Romanian and eastern Serbian folklore

Cămașa ciumei (Romanian: cămașa ciumei, lit. 'the plague's shirt'; dialectal cămașa ciumii) is the Romanian name for an apotropaic textile made in a single day or night to avert epidemic disease and other dangers. The rite was recorded across Oltenia, Muntenia, Transylvania, Dobruja, Maramureș, Bukovina and the Banat, as well as among Romanian-speaking communities in the Timok Valley and other parts of eastern Serbia. Its central operation compressed the preparation of fibre, spinning, warping, weaving, cutting and sewing into one uninterrupted period, usually carried out by a specially constituted group of women.

Recorded objects included wearable shirts, miniature garments small enough for a baby or doll, and late twentieth-century examples from eastern Serbia made from an opened hemp sack through which a person crawled. Depending on the locality, the finished textile was offered at the village boundary, hung in a tree, buried, burned, cast into the wind, placed on an anthropomorphic effigy, worn by a sick person, or held open while inhabitants passed through it. Ethnographic records assign it protection against plague and cholera, illness in newborn children, infertility, nervous illness, threats to crops and livestock, and bullets or death in war.

The earliest known written notice from the Romanian lands appears in Anton-Maria del Chiaro's 1718 history of Wallachia, which records women producing a hemp shirt within twenty-four hours and then burning it. Twentieth- and twenty-first-century research documented both remembered performances and surviving garments, including wartime uses in eastern Serbia in 1991 and 1999. In the Oltenian villages studied by Natalia Golant, manufacture had ceased while commemorative feasts remained in use, and in the Timok villages she studied, some families retained shirts although no new ones were being made.

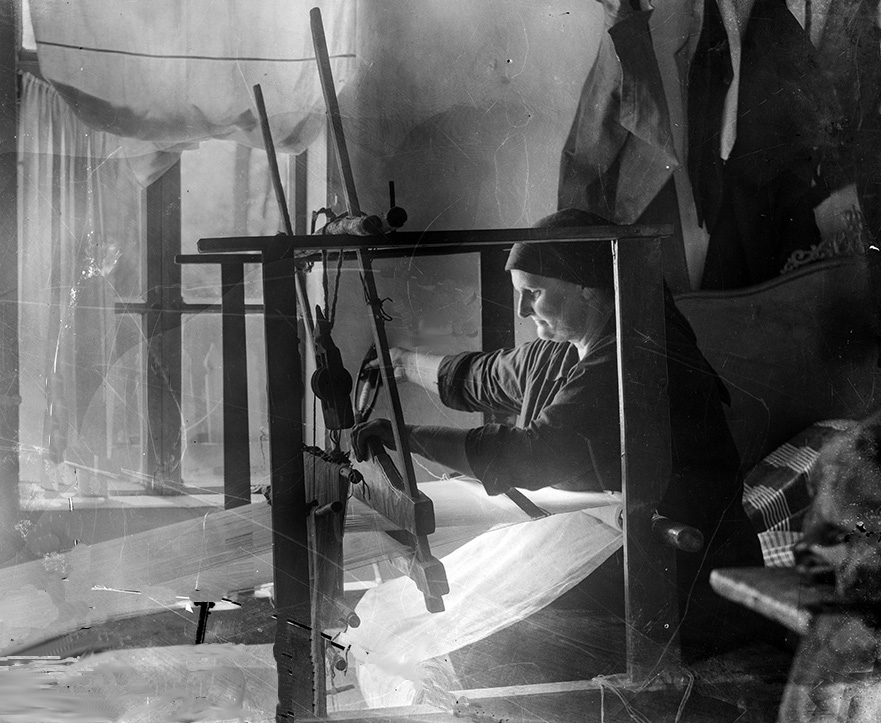
A Romanian woman working at a handloom; weaving formed one stage of the overnight production sequence.

== Names and geographical range ==
The standard Romanian expression combines cămașă (“shirt”) with the genitive of ciumă (“plague”), and ethnographic publications also record ia ciumei (“the plague's blouse”) and the Oltenian name cămașa de izbândă (“victory shirt” or “success shirt”). The dialectal form cămașa ciumii occurs in the Romanian speech of the Timok Valley and in the title of field research on communities north and south of the Danube.

Romanian ethnographic literature places the custom in Transylvania, Oltenia and Dobruja and also records it in Muntenia, Maramureș and Bukovina. Historical research on plague in Transylvania adds the Banat and treats the overnight shirt as a regional practice known in several western Romanian provinces. Museum documentation distinguishes a Transylvanian and Banat pattern commonly named cămașa ciumei from the names cămașa de izbândă and ia ciumei reported in Oltenia and Muntenia.

In eastern Serbia, reports come from Bukovče, Kobišnica (Cobișnița), Jabukovac (Icubovăț), Mosna, Boljetin, Donji Milanovac, Gradskovo, Halovo, Mali Jasenovac and Šipikovo, with additional evidence from Romanian-speaking settlements in the Braničevo District area. Golant's field sites in the municipalities of Negotin (Negotin) and Zaječar (Zaicear or Zăiceari) were villages whose Romanian-speaking inhabitants used the Oltenian-derived local speech known in Serbia as “Tsaran”.

The plague shirt belongs to a wider Balkan and eastern European class of textiles completed within one day, but the names and uses of those objects were not identical. Serbian sources call a related garment jednodanka košulja (“one-day shirt”), while Bulgarian чумино платно and Macedonian чумино платно designate a one-night “plague cloth” or “plague canvas”. Romanian speech also preserved the comparison a lucra la cămașa ciumei, applied to work done with exceptional speed, and an equivalent expression was recorded at Ponoarele.

== Historical documentation and scholarship ==
Del Chiaro served as secretary to the Wallachian prince Constantin Brâncoveanu, and his 1718 account is the earliest publication presently identified by researchers as mentioning the rite in the Romanian lands. His account states that women spun, wove and sewed a hemp shirt within twenty-four hours and burned it, establishing the defining time limit in the earliest written record.

Later collections established that the practice was geographically widespread and locally variable. Ion Aurel Candrea's synthesis of Romanian medical folklore, first published in 1944, assembled records from several regions and included both communal passage through the garment and the use of a dressed effigy. Ion Chelcea's 1936 field record from Feleac documented a complete Tuesday-night performance, while Milorad Dragić's 1969 study preserved information about a Bukovče shirt made in the late 1930s and the functions assigned to it in the 1960s.

Camelia Burghele published the dedicated monograph Cămașa ciumei: Note pentru o antropologie a sănătății in 2003 and returned to the subject in a 2020 study based on historical ethnography and field material from Sălaj. Valentin Arapu's 2021 study compared Romanian variants with Greek and South Slavic material and organized the rite around its participants, production, movement to the boundary and offerings. Golant's 2022 English-language study combined earlier literature with fieldwork conducted in 2011 in the Ponoarele area and in 2014, 2021 and 2022 in eastern Serbia.

== Ritual procedure ==
=== Selection of the makers ===
Recorded groups usually contained three, seven or nine women, although individual local accounts give other numbers. The makers could be elderly women, widows, postmenopausal women, virgins or women sharing the same given name, and the applicable condition depended on the locality. Romanian sources called some elderly participants femei iertate or “forgiven women”, a regional designation for women past menstruation whose ritual status permitted them to perform the work.

At Ocoliș, seven elderly women made the shirt, while the Boșorod record specifies nine elderly women. A Făgăraș tradition required seven women named Maria, and Mali Jasenovac required six widows named Stana. In Țara Lăpușului the makers were widows, whereas records from Țara Codrului and Țara Lăpușului also place young unmarried women under the supervision of a woman experienced in the procedure.

Participation could extend beyond the makers themselves. At Didic, representatives of several villages gathered at a road junction and produced the garment for the communities collectively, while in variants centred on passage through the shirt, the entire village assembled after the sewing was finished.

=== Time, material and work ===
The production period began after sunset or on a Tuesday evening in many Romanian records and ended before sunrise or the first cockcrow. Other accounts specify one calendar day or simply one night, so the compressed duration was more consistent than the precise weekday. Hemp was the usual raw material, and the group had to transform it into a wearable or symbolically complete object without using cloth prepared in advance.

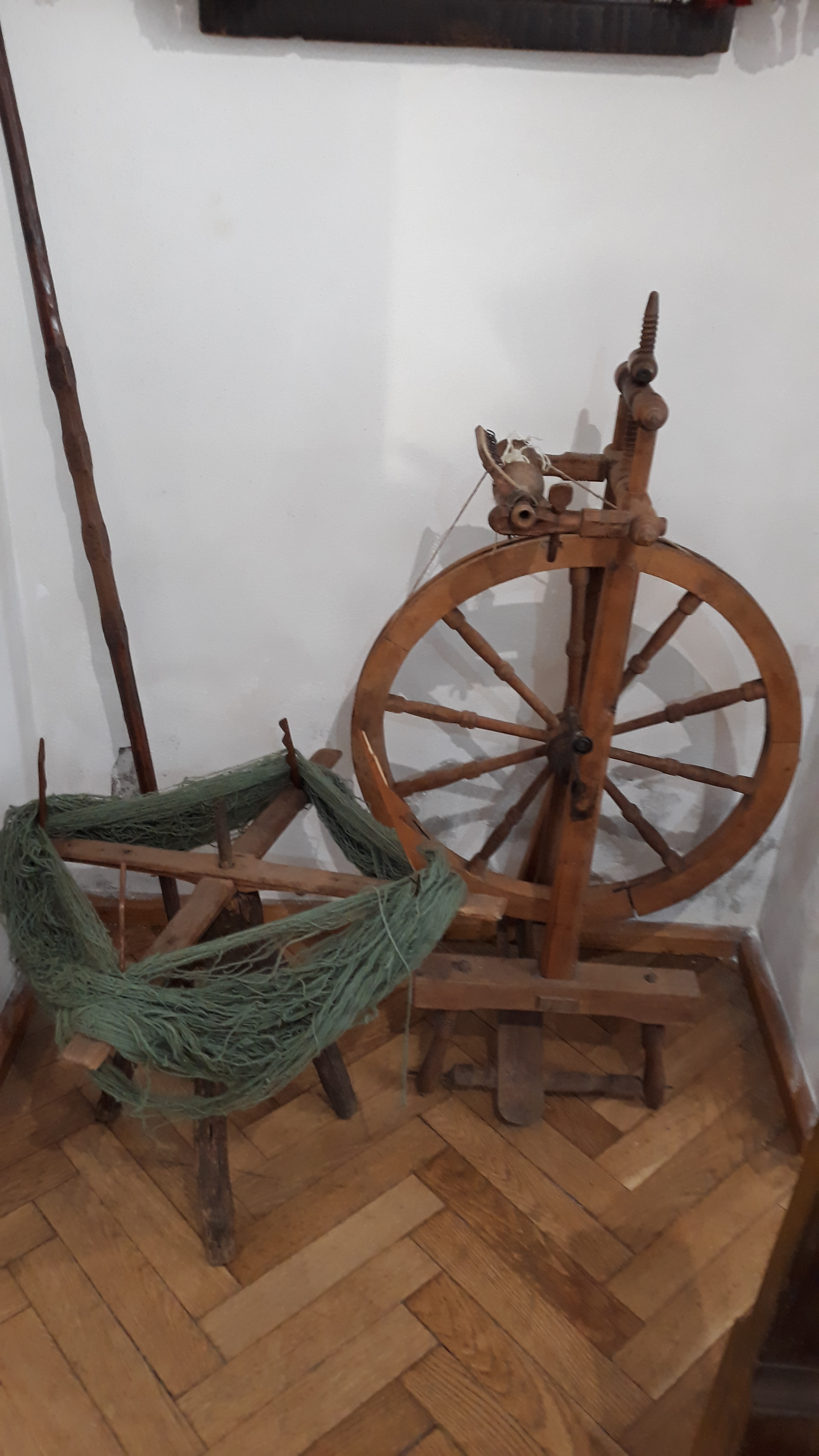
A Transylvanian spinning wheel; the rite compressed spinning, weaving, cutting and sewing into a single night or day.

The women divided the successive tasks of processing the fibre, spinning the thread, preparing the warp, weaving the cloth, cutting the pieces and sewing the shirt. All stages of a domestic production cycle that ordinarily took much longer were completed before the deadline.

Several Transylvanian records impose silence, fasting and abstention from water during the work, and some require loose hair or nudity. The 1936 Feleac record places nine naked women at work by night and notes that distaffs, spindles, stools and other objects were turned upside down or used in an inverted position. These restrictions were not universal, because the Gradskovo procession included singing, shouting and the rattling of dishes after the shirt had been completed.

=== Movement to the boundary ===
The finished shirt was commonly carried away from the household to a village edge, field boundary, crossroads, road junction, barren tree or other place separating inhabited land from the exterior. In one Boșorod version, the women carried it successively across seven boundaries before leaving it outside the protected space. The journey could require silence and a prohibition on looking back, as recorded at Feleac, Aghireș and Solona.

Food, drink or objects could accompany the textile. Records mention bread, cooked food, water, a hat placed above a shirt on a pole, or a table set at the boundary, and the assemblage was left for the personified Plague. In the Șpring account, nine widows placed the shirt on a wooden support at the village edge and added a hat; the disappearance of both objects by morning signified that the offering had been taken.

Disposal varied by region and by intended use. The shirt might be burned, buried at a crossroads, hung in a tree, thrown into the wind or left at the boundary, while a shirt retained for healing or wartime protection remained in a household. Some Romanian records pair the shirt with a female rag or straw figure that was dressed, carried out, buried and mourned as though a funeral had taken place.

=== Passage through the shirt ===
Several records use the completed garment as an opening through which people passed. In an Oltenian account associated with the name cămașa de izbândă, two or three people held the shirt in an open place or at the village edge while men and women crawled through it to avert cholera. A Dolj variant directed participants through the garment from collar to hem, and eastern Serbian records distinguish adults crawling through it from babies being pulled through.

Passage could be repeated three times for a person leaving for military service, after which the participant took a loose thread or fragment as a portable protective object. A small garment or an opening cut in a hemp sack was sufficient for this operation in the late examples from Šipikovo and Mali Jasenovac.

== Recorded local variants ==
Selected ethnographic records
Locality and date	Makers and production	Use, destination or disposal
Șpring, Sibiu County	Nine widows completed every stage of a shirt during the night.	They carried it to the village edge on a wooden support, placed a hat with it and found both gone the following morning.
Feleac, Cluj County, recorded in 1936	Nine women worked naked on a Tuesday night, using inverted tools and completing the shirt before dawn.	They carried it out without looking back and left it beyond the inhabited area.
Aghireș, Sălaj County, remembered in 1982	Women worked in silence while fasting and abstaining from water.	The shirt was left on a table or chair at the boundary, and the women returned without looking back.
Solona, Sălaj County, account transmitted in 2019	Women completed the garment on a Tuesday night.	Men carried it silently to a barren tree outside the village and returned without looking back.
Breb, Maramureș County	The shirt was made overnight for a person affected by illness.	The patient slept in it; other local forms buried the garment at a boundary or suspended it in a tree.
Boșorod, Hunedoara County	Nine elderly women wove the shirt during a communal working gathering.	The summer rite protected fields, pastures, orchards and household animals from a destructive calamity.
Ponoarele, Mehedinți County	Local legend assigns the overnight making to a widow and neighbouring women after Plague demanded a shirt.	The legend links the garment with Plague's departure and with a local hill named Dealul Cămășii, “Shirt Hill”.
Dolj, Oltenia	The completed garment was held open for collective use.	Inhabitants passed through it from the collar toward the hem as protection against epidemic disease.
Bukovče, eastern Serbia, late 1930s–1980s	Accounts name either three or nine elderly women, and one version specifies nine widows; the shirt could be small enough for a baby or doll.	Recorded uses included epidemics, newborn children, nervous illness, infertility and protection from bullets.
Gradskovo, eastern Serbia, first half of the twentieth century	Women made a small shirt in one night.	They carried it with food to a crossroads while singing, shouting and rattling dishes, cast the shirt into the wind and left the food for Plague and diseases.
Mali Jasenovac, eastern Serbia	Six widows named Stana had to perform every stage in one night.	The retained garment, remembered as resembling an opened hemp sack, served men leaving for military service or war.
Šipikovo, eastern Serbia, 1991 and 1999	A household preserved a sack-like plague shirt after manufacture had ceased.	Men bound for military duty crawled through it three times and carried away a thread.

== Functions ==
=== Epidemic disease ===
Plague and cholera provide the earliest and most widespread stated purposes of the shirt. The overnight deadline, movement to the edge of the settlement and disposal of the object formed a collective response intended to make the disease leave the community. The shirt could therefore function as an offering placed outside the village, an object through which the population passed, or clothing transferred to an effigy that was expelled or buried.

Local vocabulary could extend “plague” to any severe collective illness. Burghele's field material records villagers applying the term to grave diseases affecting many people or animals even when the illness was not historically identified as bubonic plague. Records also assign the shirt to protection against cholera and to the agricultural and pastoral dangers named in the Boșorod account.

=== Individual health and reproduction ===
In Bukovče, twentieth-century testimony assigned the shirt to newborns in families with repeated child deaths, to people with nervous illness and to adults seeking protection during an epidemic. One informant reported purchasing a miniature shirt in the 1980s after a prolonged inability to become pregnant, a use that Golant did not find in the other villages she studied. Another Bukovče narrative tells of an elderly woman putting on the completed shirt so that Plague would turn from a sick child toward her.

A Maramureș variant allowed the sick person to sleep in the completed garment. The preserved-object form differed from expulsion rites because the shirt remained available for later passage, wearing or removal of a protective thread.

=== Agriculture and livestock ===
The Boșorod record places the rite during the vegetative period, usually in summer, and directs it toward fields, pastures, orchards and domestic animals. Gherghina Boda interprets ciumă in this local context as a name for a destructive calamity affecting the community's productive territory, not only a disease of humans. Nine elderly women made the Boșorod shirt during a communally organized weaving session.

=== War and military service ===
Eastern Serbian records from Šipikovo, Mali Jasenovac and Halovo assign the shirt to men entering the army or a war zone and record no epidemic-protection use in those villages. The man crawled through the opening, sometimes three times, and could carry a thread or piece of the textile on his person. Informants connected this procedure with military service in 1991 and with deployment during the Kosovo conflict in 1999; the ethnographic account records the rites and the participants' safe return.

Dragić's 1960s material from Bukovče already included protection of soldiers from bullets, and Romanian folklore used the name cămașa de izbândă for an Oltenian protective shirt. Serbian records from the Pirot area likewise required men leaving for the front to pass through a one-day shirt, while fragments or threads were sewn into a recruit's belt in other Serbian localities. Golant links the late twentieth-century revival in eastern Serbia with earlier wartime uses recorded during the Balkan Wars and both world wars, while noting that her informants did not connect the practice with the historical relationship between armies and epidemics.

== Plague personification and calendar observances ==
Romanian and Timok narratives treated Plague as an acting female being who could enter a house, demand food or clothing and be persuaded to leave. In Ponoarele she appeared as an ugly old woman, and unexplained barking by dogs could announce her approach. In Halovo, a related account spoke of several female Plagues bringing disease.

The Ponoarele legend places Plague at the house of a widow whose child was ill. Plague promised to spare the child and leave if the widow supplied a shirt before morning, and the widow gathered neighbouring women to weave, cut and sew through the night. Local tradition associated the completed bargain with the name Dealul Cămășii and with the continuing series of village feasts called Vinerea Ciumii, “Plague Friday”.

Each village of Ponoarele commune observed its own Plague Friday between Saint Elijah's day on 20 July and Saint Paraskeva's day on 14 October. Families received relatives and guests, and the customary meal was meatless because Friday was a fasting day, although modern feasts could include both fasting and non-fasting food. A Sălaj observance with a similar name fell on the first Friday after Christmas.

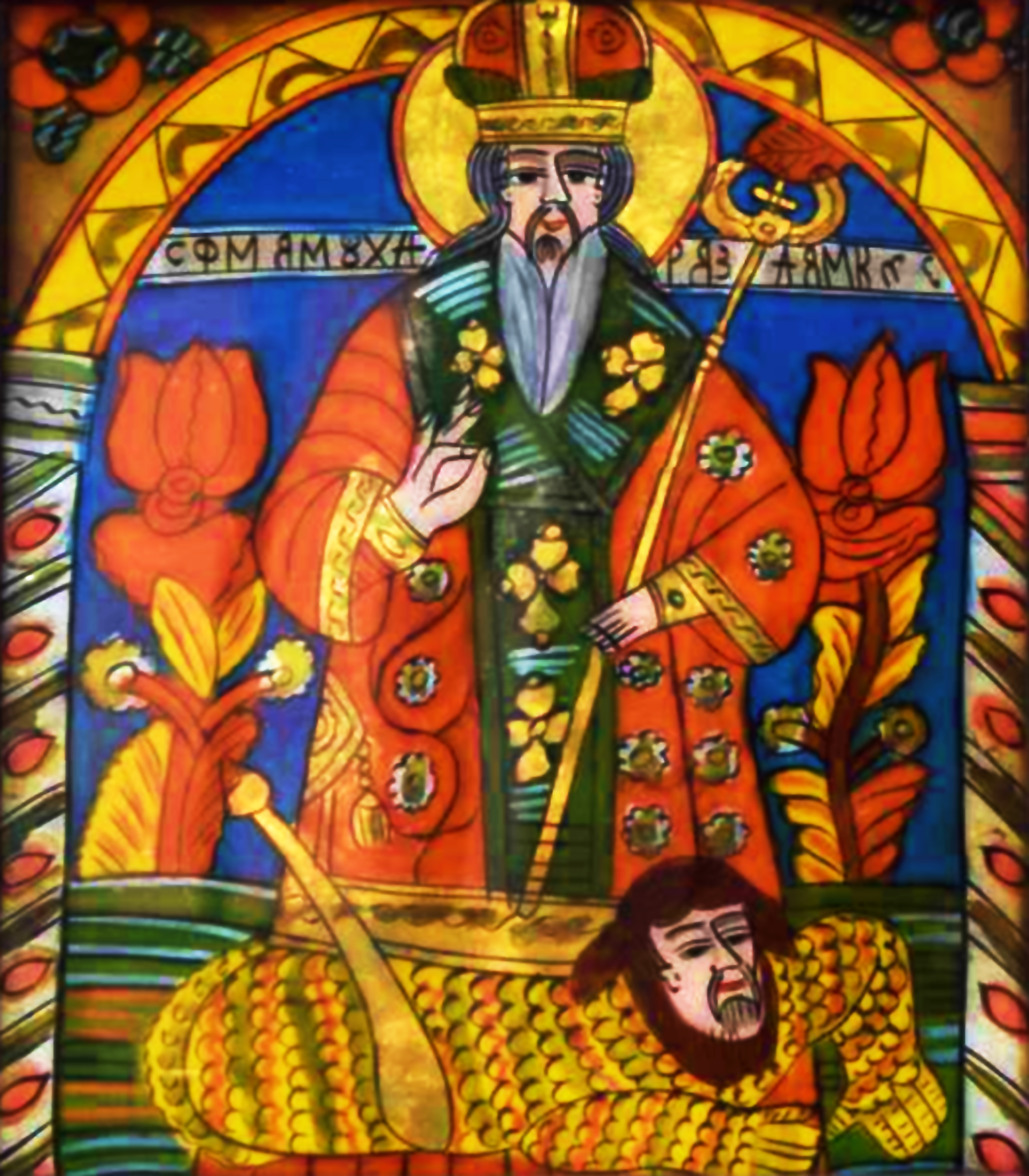
Saint Charalambos restraining the personified Plague in a nineteenth-century icon from Șcheii Brașovului, Transylvania.

Saint Charalambos supplied a Christian calendrical focus for protection against plague in Romania and neighbouring Orthodox regions. His feast falls on 10 February, and Romanian icons show him holding, chaining or subduing a personified Plague. The iconography and feast coexisted with the shirt rite, but local evidence does not make the garment part of every Charalambos observance.

In the Timok villages of Gradskovo, Halovo, Mali Jasenovac and Šipikovo, households also held commemorations or offerings for Plague under names including pomana la ciumă, pomana ciumii and pomana ciumilor. The Gradskovo commemoration accompanied the making and disposal of a shirt, whereas the commemorations recorded in Halovo, Mali Jasenovac and Šipikovo were separate from shirt production. Offerings could be placed at crossroads or near water and included fasting breads, eggs, cooked dishes and drink.

== Comparative one-day textiles ==
Serbian ethnographic records document a one-day shirt used against plague, cholera and wartime danger. A report concerning the 1837 plague outbreak states that Prince Miloš Obrenović ordered nine elderly women in Požarevac to weave and sew a shirt in one night, naked and by hearth light, after which the prince, his family and the soldiers in the barracks passed through it. Serbian communities in the Danube region also made a one-day shirt against cholera and left food and textile tools at crossroads outside the village.

In the Pirin region of Bulgaria and western parts of present-day North Macedonia, villagers produced a one-night чумино платно/чумино платно, or “plague canvas”, and the population crawled beneath it. Belarusian records give a one-day towel through which villagers passed before burning it. Comparative surveys also identify one-day shirts among Hungarians and Transylvanian Germans, although the surviving descriptions do not establish one uniform ritual across those populations.

A Greek record from the Preveza area assigns three, seven or nine women to make a cotton shirt during one day and offer it to Saint Charalambos. The Greek dedication, the Serbian passage rite and the Bulgarian–Macedonian plague canvas share the compressed production period with the Romanian shirt; their materials, recipients and final uses differ.

== Scholarly interpretation ==
Burghele treats the garment, the boundary offering and the collective labour as parts of a communal therapeutic response to a personified illness. Her analysis emphasizes that the makers supplied Plague with clothing and sometimes food, then transferred the finished assemblage beyond the inhabited area. Her examples include burning, burial, suspension in a tree and deposit at a boundary or crossroads.

Arapu groups the shirt with anthropomorphic effigies, food offerings, verbal formulas, processions and boundary sites in a wider ritual “performance” directed toward Plague. He identifies the odd-numbered group of women, the Tuesday-night deadline and passage over successive boundaries as recurrent elements; individual records omit or alter one or more of them.

Golant distinguishes plague commemoration from shirt making because the two occurred together in Gradskovo but separately in several neighbouring Timok villages. She also traces a widening of the garment's attributed functions from epidemic protection to childbirth, infertility, individual illness and war. Boda's Boșorod study supplies a further local extension by placing fields and livestock within the threatened community.

== Decline, survival and documentation ==
In the Ponoarele villages surveyed in 2011, residents no longer made plague shirts, but Plague Friday continued as a household and village feast. The feast retained the legend and calendrical observance after textile manufacture ended.

In the Negotin and Zaječar villages surveyed through 2022, some families still possessed an object called a plague shirt, although Golant found no current makers. The retained Timok garments were used for individual healing and military protection, and Golant found no current use against plague. Her 2021 fieldwork did not find use of the shirt against the COVID-19 pandemic, and she concluded that belief in its plague-healing function had disappeared in the communities examined.

The rite survives in several forms of documentation: Del Chiaro's early eighteenth-century report, nineteenth- and twentieth-century folklore collections, local field interviews, a dedicated monograph and preserved family objects. The surviving records document multiple procedures and do not preserve a single regional standard.

== See also ==
- Apotropaic magic
- Folk medicine
- Plague Maiden
- Romanian folklore
- Saint Charalambos
- Textiles in folklore
