= Adamović =

- Language: Serbo-Croatian

Adamović (Serbian Cyrillic: Адамовић) is a Serbian and Croatian surname, a patronymic derived from Adam. It may refer to:

- Draginja Adamović (1925–2000), Serbian poet
- Dušan Adamović (1893–1975), Serbian painter
- Duško Adamović (born 1973), Serbian footballer
- Filip Adamović (born 1988), Bosnian basketball player
- Gerasim Adamović (1733–1796), Serbian Eastern Orthodox bishop of Transylvania
- Goran Adamović (born 1987), Serbian footballer
- Lujo Adamović (1864–1935), Serbian botanist
- Marko Adamović (born 1991), Serbian footballer
- Miloš Adamović (born 1979), Serbian footballer
- Nenad Adamović (born 1989), Serbian footballer
- Ratko Adamović (born 1942), Serbian writer
- Vicko Adamović (1838–1919), Serbian pedagogue and historian
- Zdenko Adamović (born 1963), Croatian footballer
- Živko Adamović (1923–1998), Serbian entomologist and artist

== See also ==
- Adamovich
