= Glogovica =

Glogovica may refer to:

- Glogovica (Doboj), a village in the municipality of Doboj, Bosnia and Herzegovina
- Glogovica (Tran), a village in Tran Municipality, Bulgaria
- Glogovica (river), a river in Croatia
- Glogovica, Croatia, a settlement in the municipality of Podcrkavlje, Brod-Posavina County, Croatia
- Glogovica (Pristina), a village in Pristina, Kosovo
- Glogovica (Aleksinac), a village in the municipality of Aleksinac, Serbia
- Glogovica (Zaječar), a village in the municipality of Zaječar, Serbia
- Glogovica, Ivančna Gorica, a settlement in the municipality of Ivančna Gorica, Slovenia
