= National Museum Zaječar =

Museum in Zaječar, Serbia

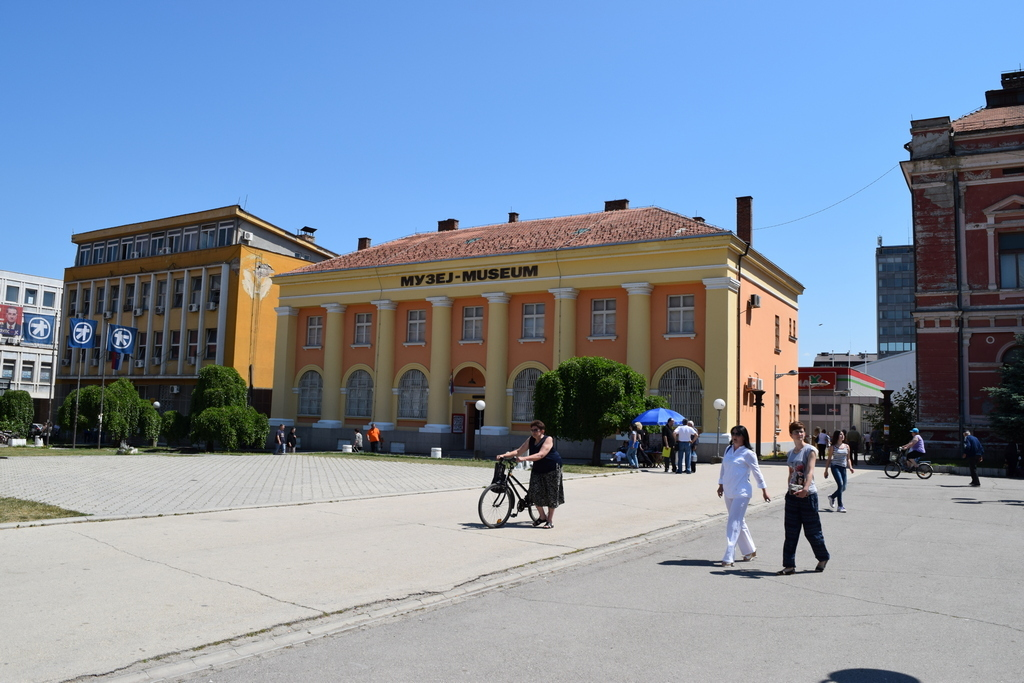
Zaječar National Museum

The National Museum is a museum in Zaječar, Serbia.

== Foundation ==
The museum was founded on March 27, 1951, as the City Museum by the Council for Education and Culture of the Zaječar city government in a small building on Dositejeva Street for the "research and preservation of cultural heritage of Zaječar County". At the end of 1951, it moved to the present building, which was constructed in 1927 for the Military Institute of Road Design. It shared the building with the local Red Cross organization and The Historical Archives, which remained in the building until 1967. Many modifications to convert the building into suitable museum exhibition space have occurred, the last in 2010.

Initially, the museum's collection was mostly photographs, World War II era documents, and "a dozen of archeological objects" that were discovered during agricultural activities. The collection grew to over 15,000 objects.

== Departments ==
=== Historical (1951) ===
This department holds 2,500 items and first focused on the National Liberation Struggle in the Timok Region, and Timok Uprising in 1883 and on World War II. After 2010, it has focused on individuals including Adam Bogosavljević, Nikola Pašić, and Đorđe Genčić.

=== Ethnological (1952) ===
This department holds 5000 objects from Zaječar and Eastern Serbia and includes jewelry, distaffs, belts, socks, and gloves. In the Museum, a part of the permanent collection is devoted to ethnology. The department also manages the 18th century folk architecture Radul-bey’s Inn which house local historical items, another 18th century building, the Turskish Watermill and a house in Mali Izvor. The museum preserves around 15,000 artifacts, ranging from prehistory to the modern era, with particularly valuable collections of mosaics, sculptures, and architectural decoration from Felix Romuliana.

=== Archeological (1955) ===
This department hold 330 objects from 3000 BC to the early first century AD, 39 objects from the second to fourth century, the Felix Romuliana collection with 3,000 objects from the fourth to sixth century, 83 objects from the Middle Ages (10th-16th century) and 684 Greek, Roman Republic, Roman Empire and Byzantine coins.

=== Art gallery (1955) ===
The art department started with 20 paintings and later grew through gifts and acquisitions. It holds over 1,000 pieces, including works of Vera Božičković Popović, Olja Ivanjicki, Leonid Šejka, Velizar Krstić, Aleksandar Luković Lukijan, Dragan Mojović, Živojin Turinski, Ljubica Cuca Sokić, Frano Mengelo Dinčić, Mira and Sava Sandić, many paintings by Dušan Adamović, and Anatolij Bajev, a Russian emigre who lived in Zaječar in 1930s.

== Notable exhibits ==
- Mosaics, sculptures, architectural decorations from the ancient Roman complex of palaces and temples Felix Romuliana, a UNESCO World Heritage Site located in the city
- Radul-bey’s Inn (19th century)
- Turkish Watermill (18th century)

== Awards ==
- Best museum in Serbia in 2012, National Committee of ICOM.

== See also ==
- List of museums in Serbia
