= Boško Ničić =

Serbian politician

- Бошко Ничић

Mayor of Zaječar
- Incumbent
- Assumed office 3 June 2017
- In office 11 May 2008 – 5 September 2012

Personal details
- Born: 18 September 1960 (age 65) Braćevac, PR Serbia, FPR Yugoslavia
- Party: ND/LS (1990–2004); ŽZK (2006–2013, 2015–2017); URS (2013–2015); SNS (2017–present)

Boško Ničić (Serbian Cyrillic: Бошко Ничић; born 18 September 1960) is a Serbian politician. He has served several terms as the mayor of Zaječar and has been a member of the National Assembly of Serbia on three occasions. He is a member of the Serbian Progressive Party.

== Early life and career ==
Ničić was born in Braćevac, in what was then the People's Republic of Serbia in the Federal People's Republic of Yugoslavia. He worked as a miner in Bor, received a degree in economics, and was a Literary Youth president.

== Political career ==
=== Milošević era ===
Ničić was active with the League of Socialist Youth in Serbia, serving on its presidency in the late 1980s. He was first elected to the Serbian parliament in the 1989 general election, the last to be held while Serbia was a one-party socialist state. One of the youngest delegates, Ničić was also one of only six representatives to vote against Slobodan Milošević's 1989 constitution, which, among other things, significantly reduced the autonomy of Vojvodina and Kosovo. With the introduction of multiparty democracy, the Socialist Youth organization reconstituted itself as New Democracy. Ničić ran under this party's banner for Bor's first constituency in the 1990 general elections and was defeated by Bratislav Dunjić of Milošević's Socialist Party of Serbia. A prominent local opponent of Milošević, Ničić was subsequently held in a pre-trial detention centre for two months in 1994, on suspicion of seeking to induce certain elected officials to abuse their positions.

New Democracy provided support for the Socialist Party in the Serbian assembly beginning in 1993, citing Milošević's professed commitment to securing a peace plan to end the Bosnian War. For the 1997 Serbian parliamentary election, New Democracy was included in the Socialist Party's electoral alliance. Ničić was included on its electoral list in the Zaječar division, although he was not selected for a mandate. The alliance between the Socialist Party and New Democracy later broke down amidst the backdrop of the Kosovo War, and Ničić returned to the political opposition.

New Democracy participated in the 2000 Yugoslavian election as a member of the Democratic Opposition of Serbia (DOS), a broad coalition of several opposition parties. Ničić led the DOS's campaign staff in Zaječar. The election was a watershed moment in Serbian and Yugoslavian politics, resulting in the fall of Milošević's government.

=== Since 2000 ===
The DOS won a landslide victory in the 2000 Serbian parliamentary election, which was held a few months after the Yugoslavian election. Ničić was included on the alliance's electoral list as a New Democracy representative and was selected for a mandate. (Beginning in 2000, the entire country of Serbia was counted as a single electoral division in parliamentary elections. Also, from 2000 to 2011, parliamentary mandates in Serbia were awarded at the discretion of successful parties or alliances, and it was common practice for mandates to be assigned to individual candidates out of numerical order. Ničić was given the seventy-second position on the list, though this had no formal bearing on his chances of election.)

Ničić welcomed the conviction of Ivan Nikolić, a soldier in the Yugoslav Army, in 2002. Nikolić was the first Serb soldier to be sentenced for war crimes by a Serbian court. Following the conviction, Ničić was quoted as saying, "This is the beginning of a process to prove that the Serb people did not commit crimes, but rather individuals did on their behalf. I hope the sentence will serve as proof to our public that there is no collective responsibility but only individual one."

New Democracy later renamed itself the Liberals of Serbia and contested the 2003 parliamentary election with its own electoral list. Ničić was included on the list, which did not cross the electoral threshold to win representation in the assembly. His second term in parliament ended in 2004. Ničić subsequently started a local political group in Zaječar called Živim za Krajinu (I Live for Krajina).

Ničić become mayor of Zaječar for the first time in 2004. Two years later, he worked with mayors of neighbouring communities in Romania and Bulgaria to develop and information exchange system for combatting avian flu. For the 2007 parliamentary election, he aligned his local party with the Serbian Renewal Movement (SPO) and appeared on its electoral list; this list also failed to cross the electoral threshold to win assembly representation. He supported Serbian Radical Party candidate Tomislav Nikolić's candidacy in the 2008 Serbian presidential election and later complained that Nikolić never acknowledged his support. Nikolić was defeated by Boris Tadić of the Democratic Party.

The Živim za Krajinu party joined the United Regions of Serbia (URS) alliance in 2010. He appeared in the fourth position on the URS's electoral list in the 2012 Serbian election and was elected when the list won sixteen mandates. (Following a 2011 reform to Serbia's electoral law, mandates were awarded to candidates from successful lists in numerical order). His return to the legislature was brief, as he could not by this time hold a dual mandate as a mayor and a member of the assembly; he resigned the latter position on 5 September 2012. He was replaced as mayor by Velimir Ognjenović in 2013.

The URS became a unified political party in 2013 through a formal merger of its regional affiliates. Ničić received the seventh position on the URS's list in the 2014 parliamentary election. The list failed to cross the electoral threshold, and the party subsequently dissolved. Ničić re-established the Živim za Krajinu group at the local level and aligned it with the Democratic Party (DS) for the 2016 parliamentary election. Democratic Party and its allies won sixteen mandates, and Ničić, who received the twenty-third position on their list, was not elected.

Ničić was returned as mayor of Zaječar in 2017, following his party's victory in local elections. Later in the year, he unexpectedly brought his local political movement into the Progressive Party.

Ničić's record as mayor has sometimes been controversial. In 2010, he was criticized by the South East Europe Media Organisation (SEEMO) for mandating that directors of companies and public institutions in the city could not talk to the media without his prior consent. He has also been criticized by the Independent Journalist Association of Serbia. In early 2019, he strongly criticized popular protests against a perceived deterioration in the quality of life for Zaječar and Serbia generally.

On 29 October 2021, Ničić's automobile that he used was burned under unknown circumstances.
