= Metris =

Metris may refer to:

- Metriš, a village in the municipality of Zaječar, Serbia
- Mercedes-Benz Metris, a minivan sold by Mercedes-Benz in North America
- Metris Prison, a prison in Istanbul, Turkey
- Metris, an American credit card issuer acquired by HSBC in 2005

Metris Urban Planning (METRIS) is a Sydney-based town planning consultancy specialising in securing planning approvals for all types of development across NSW.
