= Adamovich =

Adamovich (Russian: Адамо́вич) is a Slavic patronymic surname derived from the given name Adam.

Notable people with the surname include:

- Ales Adamovich (1927–1994), Belarusian writer
- Georgy Adamovich (1892–1972), Russian writer
- Igor von Adamovich, member of P9, a Brazilian pop group
- Mikhail Adamovich (1884–1947), Russian painter
- Tatyana Adamovich (born 1942), Russian-born American Olympic fencer

== See also ==
- Adamović
