= I Live for Krajina =

I Live for Krajina Movement Покрет Живим за Крајину Pokret Živim za Krajinu
- Abbreviation: PŽK
- Leader: Boško Ničić
- Founded: 15 November 2006
- Dissolved: 2 September 2017
- Merged into: Serbian Progressive Party
- Headquarters: Zaječar
- Ideology: Regionalism; Decentralization

Website
- www.zivimzakrajinu.org.rs (archived)

I Live for Krajina (Serbian: Живим за Крајину, romanized: Živim za Krajinu) was a regionalist political party in Serbia, centered in the Timok Valley (known as Timočka Krajina in Serbian) in the eastern part of the country. Its leader was Boško Ničić. The party won two mandates in the National Assembly of Serbia in the 2012 Serbian parliamentary election as part of the United Regions of Serbia (URS) alliance.

== History ==
Boško Ničić founded "I Live for Krajina" in Zaječar in 2006. The party contested the 2007 Serbian parliamentary election on the electoral list of the Serbian Renewal Movement, which did not cross the threshold to win representation in the assembly. Subsequently, Ničić joined with the leaders of other regionalist parties and G17 Plus to create the United Regions of Serbia.

The URS list won sixteen mandates in the 2012 parliamentary election, and two "I Live for Krajina" candidates were elected: Ničić, who had received the fourth list position, and Ivan Joković, who was fourteenth. Ničić resigned from the assembly on 5 September 2012, as he was also the mayor of Zaječar and could not hold a dual mandate; his replacement was Rajko Stevanović.

The United Regions of Serbia became a unified political party in 2013, and all of its member parties, including "I Live for Krajina", were merged into it at the republic level. The URS failed to cross the electoral threshold in the 2014 Serbian parliamentary election, lost its assembly representation, and subsequently dissolved. Ničić later brought "I Live for Krajina" into an alliance with the Democratic Party for the 2016 parliamentary election; the Democratic list won sixteen seats in the assembly, and Ničić, who appeared as the highest-ranked member of his party in the twenty-third position, was not returned.

Ničić joined the Serbian Progressive Party in 2017, taking much of the membership of "I Live for Krajina" with him.
