= Mala Jasikova =

Mala Jasikova Мала Јасикова
- Village
- Location within Serbia
- Coordinates: 44°04′58″N 22°18′13″E
- Country: Serbia
- District: Zaječar District
- Municipality: Zaječar

Area
  - Total: 12.54 km^{2} (4.84 sq mi)
- Elevation: 299 m (981 ft)

Population (2011)
  - Total: 212
  - Density: 16.9/km^{2} (43.8/sq mi)
- Time zone: UTC+1 (CET)
  - Summer (DST): UTC+2 (CEST)

Mala Jasikova is a village located in the city of Zaječar, Serbia. According to the 2011 census, the village has a population of 212 inhabitants.

== Gallery ==
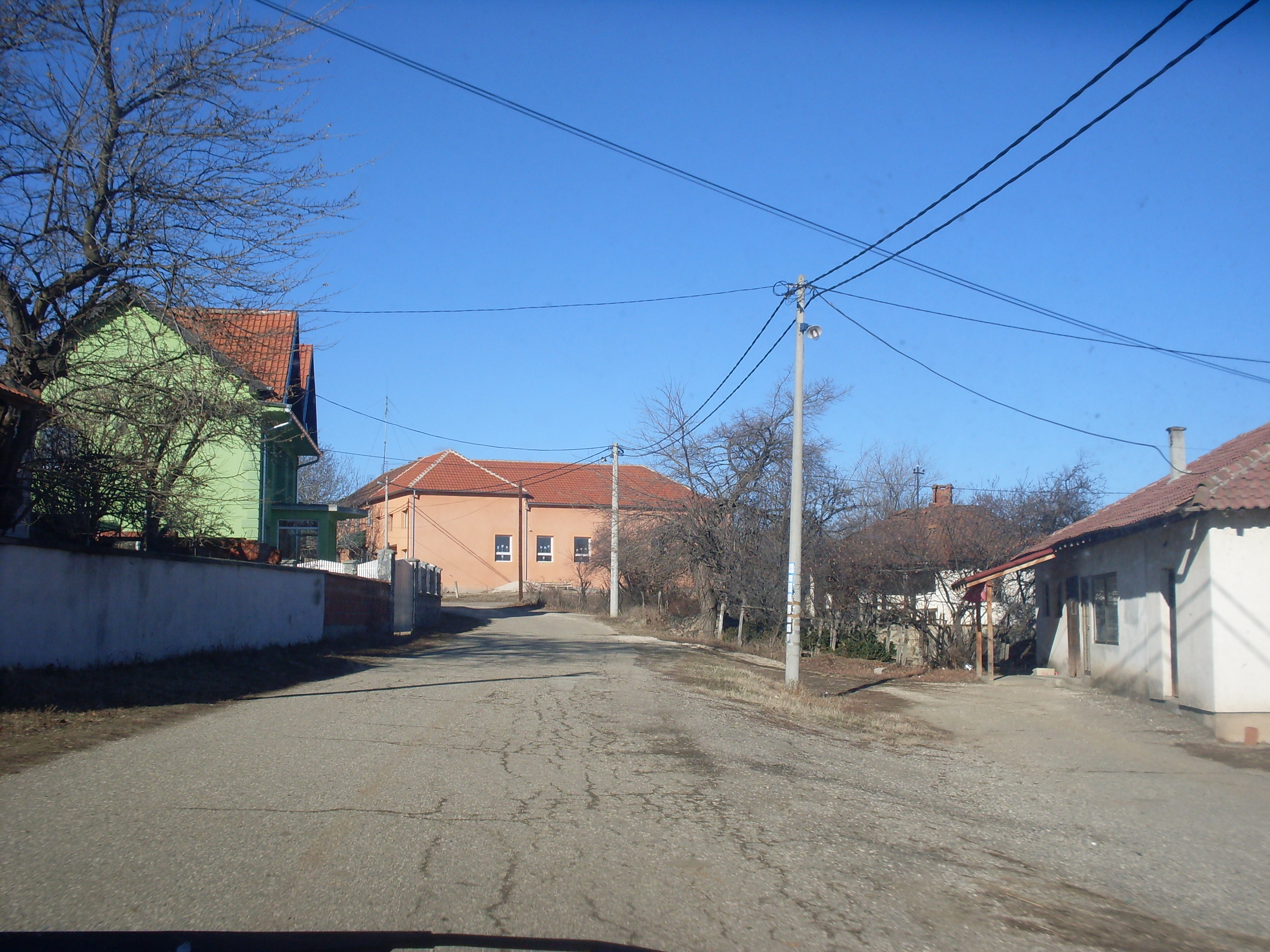
Mala Jasikova centre street

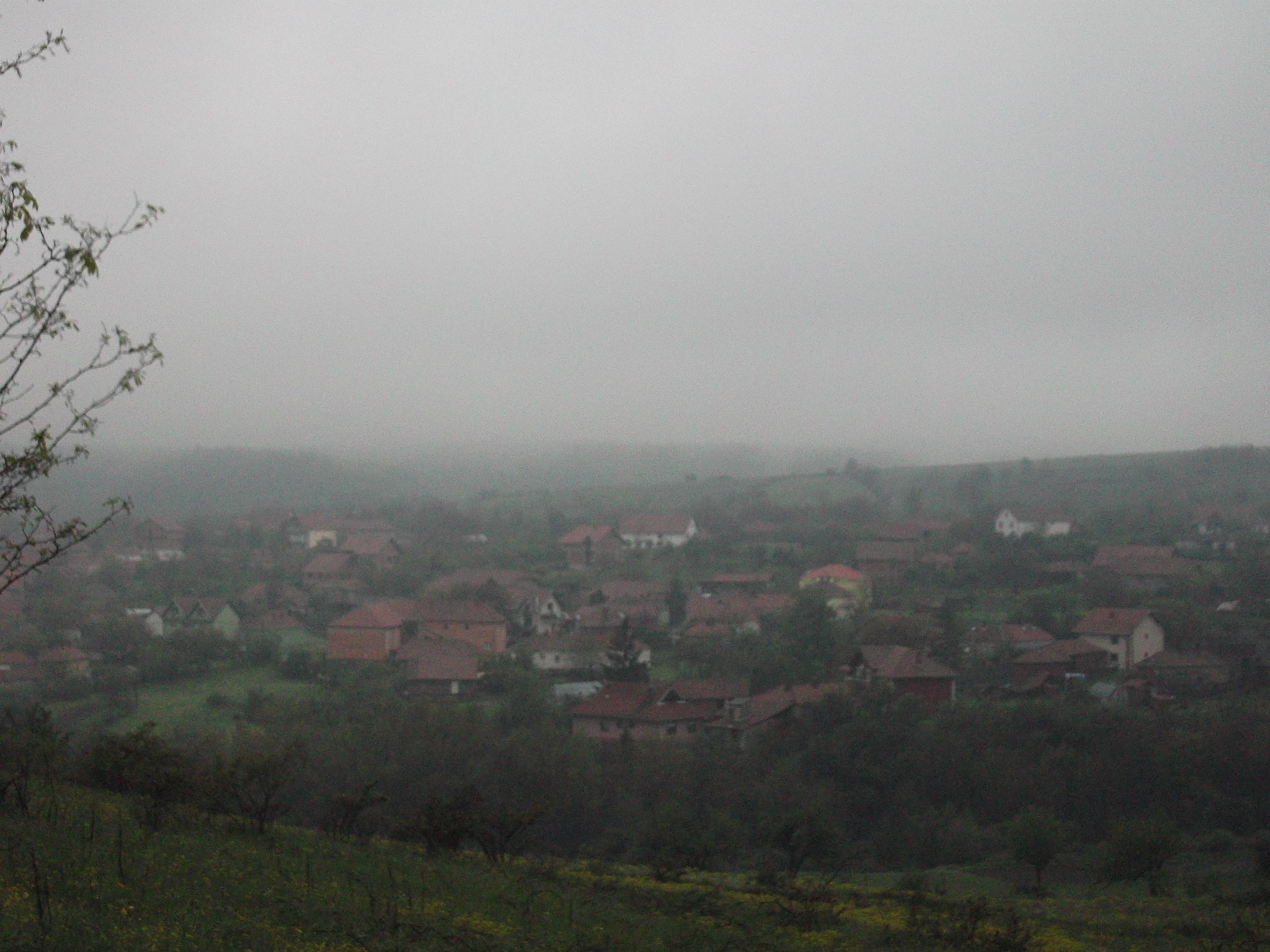
Mala Jasikova panorama

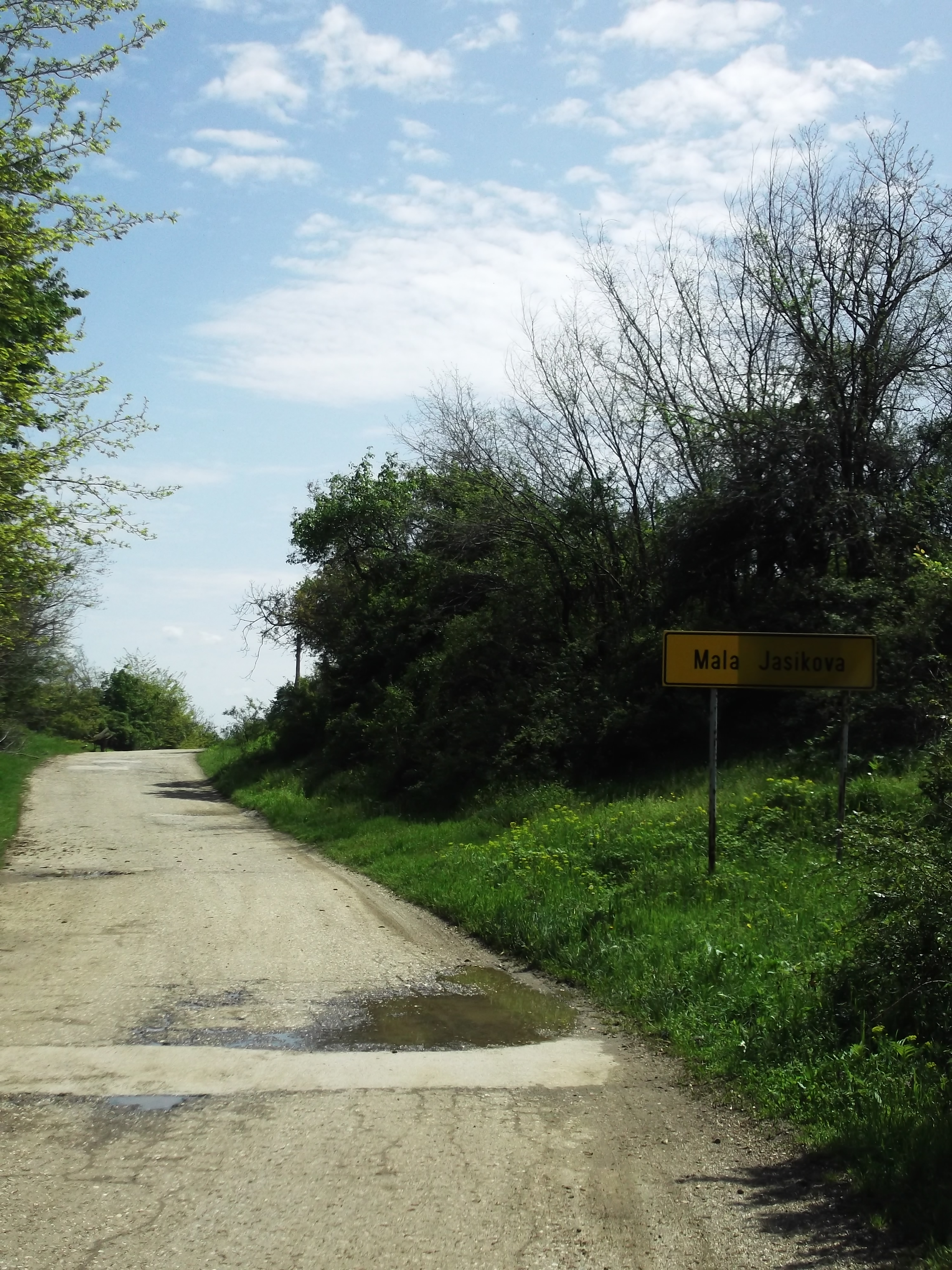
Mala Jasikova
