= ZALET =

ZALET ЗАЛЕТ
- Official logo
- Frequency: Annually
- Locations: Zaječar, Serbia
- Years active: 2005–present
- Inaugurated: 2005; 21 years ago

ZALET (stylised as ZA*73T) are a collection of events occurring in Zaječar, Serbia, as a need to initiate, organize and support cultural events, to affirm artists and to intermediate in transmission of diverse artistic expressions and tendencies. Besides organizing pseudo-classical manifestations such as exhibitions, concerts, poetic evenings etc., the accent is put on innovative and progressive artistic expressions: performances, comics, low-fi videos, video art, conceptual art, as well as a union of traditional fine art and conceptual art.

== History ==
The first ZALET was held in 2005. In the past five years, the festival has hosted more than 300 artists. ZALET organized 27 exhibitions, 2 theatric performances, 14 murals, 6 poetic evenings, and 11 performances. 34 bands played at the festival. There were also 8 showings of short films.
