= Šipikovo =

- Village
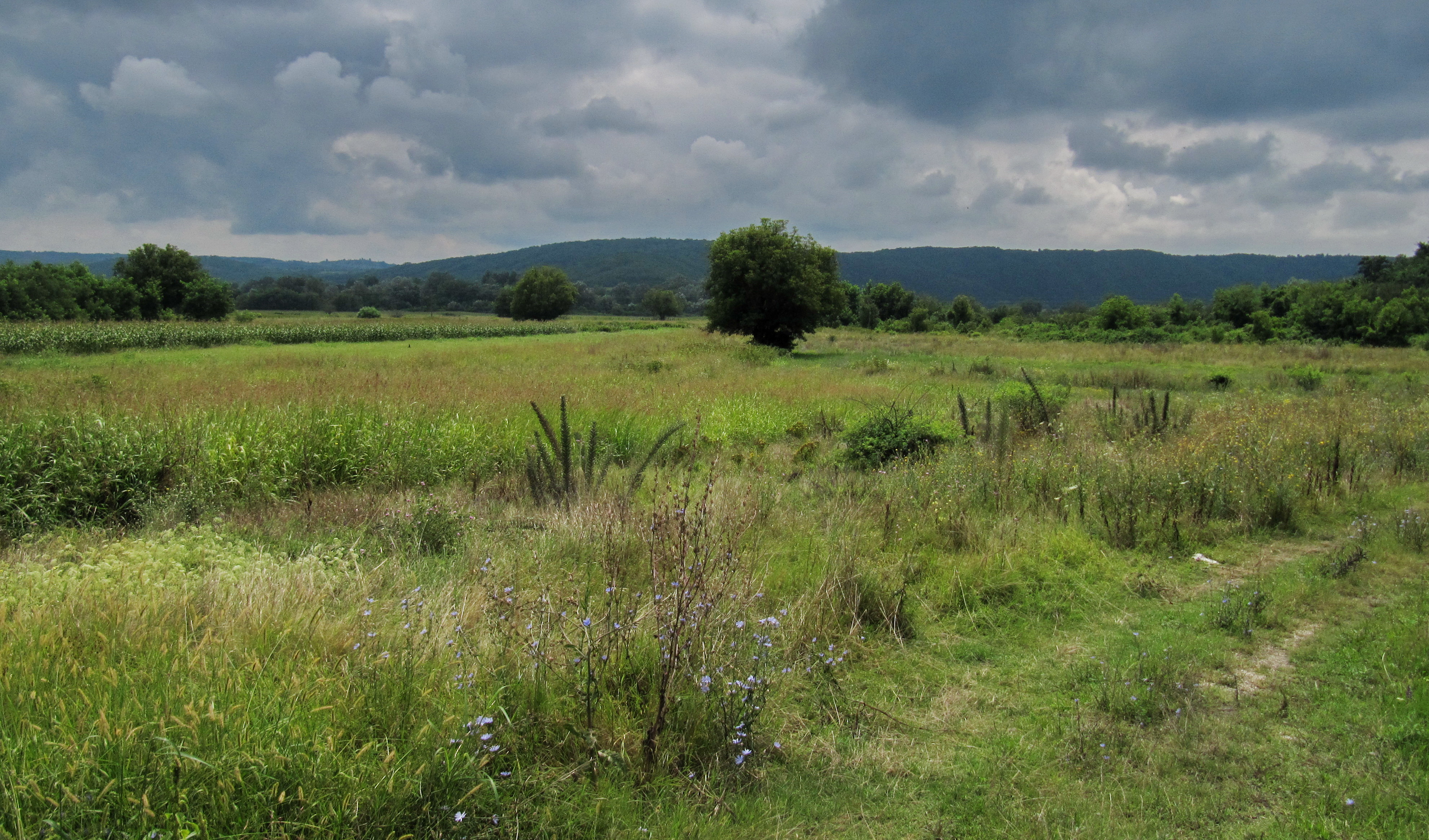
- Šipikovo Serbia.jpg

- Location within Serbia
- Coordinates: 44°01′N 22°29′E
- Country: Serbia
- District: Zaječar District
- Municipality: Zaječar

Population (2002)
  - Total: 511
- Time zone: UTC+1 (CET)
  - Summer (DST): UTC+2 (CEST)

Šipikovo is a village in the municipality of Zaječar, Serbia. According to the 2002 census, the village has a population of 511 people.
