= Gerasim Adamović =

Eastern Orthodox Bishop of Transilvania

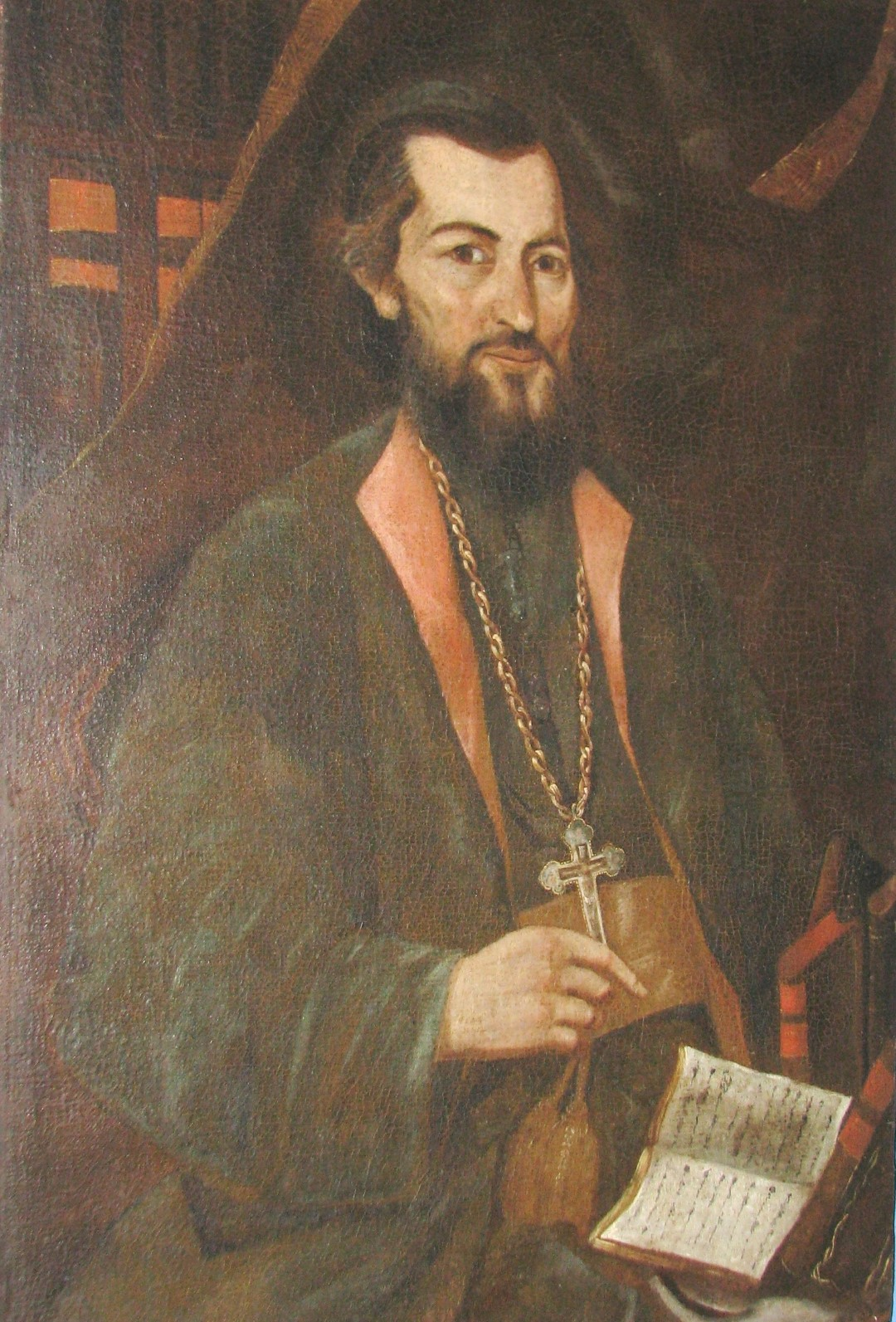
Portrait of Bishop Gherasim Adamovici (author unknown)

Gerasim Adamović (Serbian: Герасим Адамовић, Romanian: Gherasim Adamovici; 1733–1796) was Serbia-born Eastern Orthodox bishop of Transylvania (1789–1796) when it was under Austria-Hungary rule.

== Biography ==
Gerasim Adamović was born in a Serbian family in the town of Šikloš in southern Hungary.

During 1779–1783 he was archimandrite of the Sveti Đurađ monastery in Birda (Манастир Светог великомученика Георгија, also Шенђурац на Брзави). He was also archimandrite of the Serbian Bezdin Monastery (1783–1789).

He was one of the signatories of the second, expanded version of Supplex Libellus Valachorum, a petition for Romanians (valachorum) of Transylvania to be equal in political, economic and religious rights to the privileged groups: Transylvanian nobles, Transylvanian Saxons (Germans), and Székelys (Hungarians).

Adamović was the last Serbian Bishop of Transylvania. He had residence in the village of Rășinari near Sibiu
