= Mali Izvor (Zaječar) =

Coordinates: 43°43′37″N 22°19′07″E

- Village
- Interactive map of Mali Izvor
- Country: Serbia
- District: Zaječar District
- Municipality: Zaječar

Population (2002)
  - Total: 454
- Time zone: UTC+1 (CET)
  - Summer (DST): UTC+2 (CEST)

Mali Izvor is a village in the municipality of Zaječar, Serbia. According to the 2002 census, the village has a population of 454 people.
