= Tatyana Adamovich =

American fencer

Personal information
- Born: 20 December 1942 (age 83) Smolensk, Russia

Sport
- Sport: Fencing

Tatyana Pavlovna Adamovich (born 20 December 1942) is a Russian-born American former fencer. She competed in the women's team foil event at the 1972 Summer Olympics.
