= Veliki Jasenovac =

Veliki Jasenovac Велики Ясеновец
- Village
- Location within Serbia
- Coordinates: 44°03′N 22°26′E
- Country: Serbia
- District: Zaječar District
- Municipality: Zaječar

Population (2012)
  - Total: 396
- Time zone: UTC+1 (CET)
  - Summer (DST): UTC+2 (CEST)

Veliki Jasenovac is a village in the municipality of Zaječar, Serbia. According to the 2002 census, the village has a population of 370 people.

Ethnic group:

Bulgarians 2%

Romanians 3%

Serbs 95%
