= Plague Maiden =

Lithuanian-Polish folktale apparition

Folk tale
- Name: Plague Maiden
- Also known as: The Maid of Pestilence; Polish: Morowa dziewica Plague Woman; Pesta
- Country: Polish–Lithuanian Commonwealth
- Region: Eastern Europe

The Plague Maiden (Polish: Morowa dziewica, 'Maid of Pestilence') is the name given to an apparition from a Lithuanian-Polish folktale. She was said to appear before a plague befell a town. She is often described as waving a red handkerchief through victim's doors, either because it is dyed that way or because it is soaked with blood. Some folktales say that she wears white and has a fiery wreath across her temples. Another such description of her shows that she is an older woman, haggard and tall. Her ailing frame is draped by a decrepit white robe.

Another such folktale appears in Slovenia, with a so called plague woman who is an outsider to a small township and dares not enter the township without some help. She is shunned by many of the townsfolk except one man whom she manages to convince to give her a ride into the town using his cart. In recompense for his actions she remembers his house. As the plague wreaked havoc on the town, he managed to survive the plague, saved by virtue of his kindness

A popular ballad told the tale of a man who killed the plague maiden using a sword inscribed with the names of Jesus and the Virgin Mary and stole her handkerchief. At the end of the ballad, though the man and his family die, their town is never again touched by plague. The red handkerchief was supposedly kept at the town church, but the location is never named.

The legend was mentioned by Adam Mickiewicz in his poem Konrad Wallenrod.

== Bibliography ==
- Mickiewicz, Adam (1975). Konrad Wallenrod and other writings of Adam Mickiewicz. Translated by Parish, Jewell; Radin, Dorothea Prall; Noyes, George Rapall. Westport, Conn.: Greenwood Press. ISBN 0-8371-7743-X. OCLC 1217359.
- Siemieński, Lucjan (1845). "132. Morowa dziewica". Podania i legendy polskie, ruskie i litewskie (in Polish).
- Grimm, Jacob (1999) [1883]. Teutonic mythology. Vol. 3. Translated by Stallybrass, James Steven. London: Routledge. ISBN 0-415-22108-0. OCLC 43516657.
- Ziegler, Philip (2009) [1969]. "V. Germany: The Flagellants and the Persecution of the Jews". The black death. London: Faber & Faber. ISBN 978-0-06-171898-4. OCLC 979567567.
- Muniz, Alanna. The Survival of the Neolithic Goddess in Polish Folklore, Myth, and Tradition. Institute of Transpersonal Psychology, 2010.
