= Glogovica (Doboj) =

Coordinates: 44.9447°N 18.0925°E

Glogovica Глоговица
- Village
- Location within Bosnia and Herzegovina
- Country: Bosnia and Herzegovina
- Entity: Republika Srpska
- Municipality: Doboj
- Time zone: UTC+1 (CET)
  - Summer (DST): UTC+2 (CEST)

Glogovica (Cyrillic: Глоговица) is a village in the municipality of Doboj, Republika Srpska, Bosnia and Herzegovina.
