= Dušan Adamović =

Serbian painter

Dušan Adamović (28 July 1893, in Sanski Most, Bosnia-Herzegovina, Ottoman Empire – 17 November 1975, in Niš, Serbia, Yugoslavia) was a Serbian painter and art pedagogue.

== Biography ==
Dušan Adamović was born on 28 July 1893 in Sanski Most, where he finished rudimentary schooling and after began learning watchmaking and goldsmithing at a Craft School in Zagreb. From 1911 to 1914, he attended a painting course at the College of Arts and Crafts in Zagreb. After that, he went to the Academt of Fine Arts in Prague, where he studied painting in the period from 1920 to 1923. At that time, the following Serbian artists were in Prague: Milivoje Uzelac (1897-1977), Vera Milić (1900-1943), Milenko D. Đurić (1894-1945), Milan Konjović (1898-1993), Kosta Hakman (1899-1961), Ivan Radović (1894-1973) - some of them the founders of our modernity. In Prague, Dušan Adamović exhibited in groups for the first time. Upon his return to the country, he worked as a high school drawing teacher in Skopje from 1923 to 1941. After his release from 1945 until his retirement in 1960, he worked in Zaječar as a professor of German language and drawing.

He exhibited independently in Zaječar in 1945 and 1972, and in groups at Kostajnica, Zagreb, Belgrade, Skopje, Subotica, Kutina and Smederevo in 1973 and 1974. Retrospective exhibitions were organized in 1976 and 2001 in the Zaješar National Museum, where most of his works are now kept.

Dušan Adamović died in Niš on 17 November 1975.
