= Klenovac, Serbia =

Klenovac
- Village
- Location within Serbia
- Country: Serbia
- District: Zaječar District
- Municipality: Zaječar

Population (2002)
  - Total: 250
- Time zone: UTC+1 (CET)
  - Summer (DST): UTC+2 (CEST)

Klenovac is a village in the municipality of Zaječar, Serbia. According to the 2002 census, the village has a population of 250 people.
