= Mali Jasenovac =

Coordinates: 44°02′06″N 22°26′31″E

- Village
- Interactive map of Mali Jasenovac
- Country: Serbia
- District: Zaječar District
- Municipality: Zaječar

Population (2002)
  - Total: 284
- Time zone: UTC+1 (CET)
  - Summer (DST): UTC+2 (CEST)

Mali Jasenovac is a village in the municipality of Zaječar, Serbia. According to the 2002 census, the village has a population of 284 people.
