= Velika Jasikova =

Velika Jasikova Велика Ясикова
- Village
- Location within Serbia
- Coordinates: 44°04′54″N 22°21′25″E
- Country: Serbia
- District: Zaječar District
- Municipality: Zaječar

Population (2011)
  - Total: 802
- Time zone: UTC+1 (CET)
  - Summer (DST): UTC+2 (CEST)

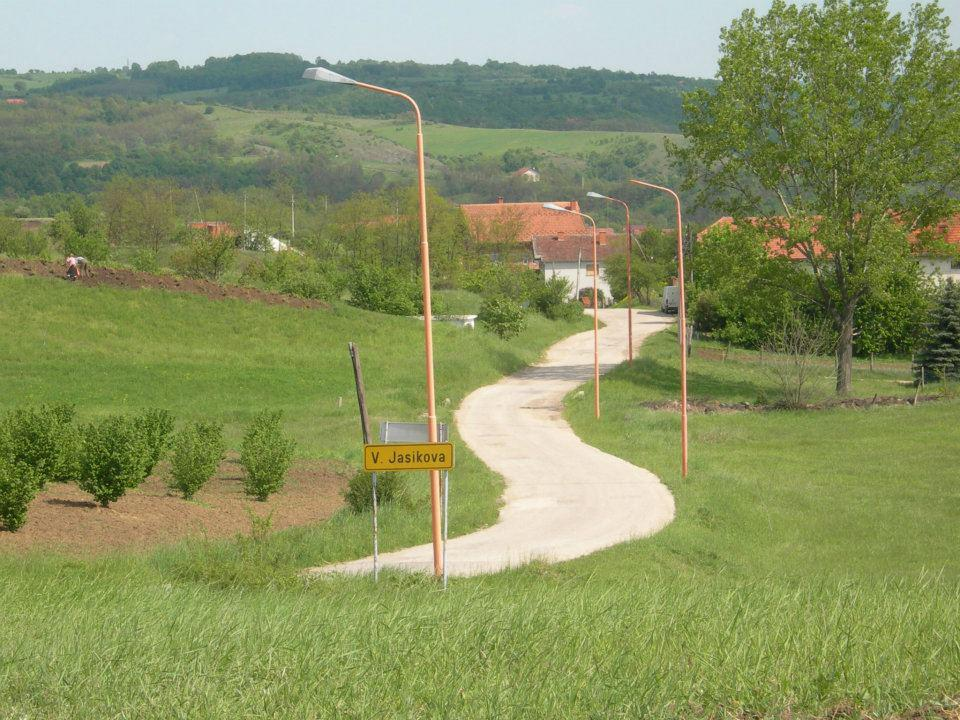

Velika Jasikova is a village in the municipality of Zaječar, Serbia. According to the 2011 census, the village has a population of 802 people.

Dominant ethnic group: Serbs 48.4% and Vlachs 35.6%.

There are Roman ruins at the outskirts of the village and the foundations of a Mediaeval church in the fields surrounding the village.

Ethnic composition(2002 census)
ethnic composition	Per cent
Serbs	48,39%
Vlachs	35.67%
Romanians	1.70%
Yugoslavs	0.40%
Croats	0.10%
Other	1.80%

Group	population(2002 census)!
Total population	988
Serbs	483
Vlachs	356
Romanians	17
Yugoslavs	4
Croats	1
Others	18
