= Gradskovo =

- Village
- Location within Serbia
- Coordinates: 44°01′10″N 22°22′51″E
- Country: Serbia
- District: Zaječar District
- Municipality: Zaječar

Population (2002)
  - Total: 666
- Time zone: UTC+1 (CET)
  - Summer (DST): UTC+2 (CEST)

Gradskovo is a village in the municipality of Zaječar, Serbia. According to the 2002 census, the village has a population of 666 people.
