= Braćevac =

Braćevac Браћевац Бракевци
- Village
- Location within Serbia
- Coordinates: 44°04′02″N 22°30′20″E
- Country: Serbia
- District: Bor District
- Municipality: Negotin

Population (2002)
  - Total: 533
- Time zone: UTC+1 (CET)
  - Summer (DST): UTC+2 (CEST)

Braćevac (Serbian Cyrillic: Браћевац) is a village in the municipality of Negotin, Serbia. According to the 2002 census, the village has a population of 533 people.

== History ==
Brakevtsi (Bulgarian: Бракевци) was located in the district of Vidin between 1878 and 1919. According to the first Bulgarian census of 1880, the village was the only settlement in Bulgaria with a majority of native speakers of Serbian. In fact, most of those recorded in the census as having Serbian as a native language lived in Brakevtsi (1067 out of 1894 people in the whole of Bulgaria). According to the Bulgarian writer Anton Strashimirov, the village was settled by Serbs from the region of Kopaonik at the beginning of the 19th century, after many of the local Bulgarians had emigrated to Bessarabia. By the provisions of the Treaty of Neuilly-sur-Seine Brakevtsi was ceded to Serbia.
