= Zaječar =

Zaječar Зајечар (Serbian)
- City
- City of Zaječar
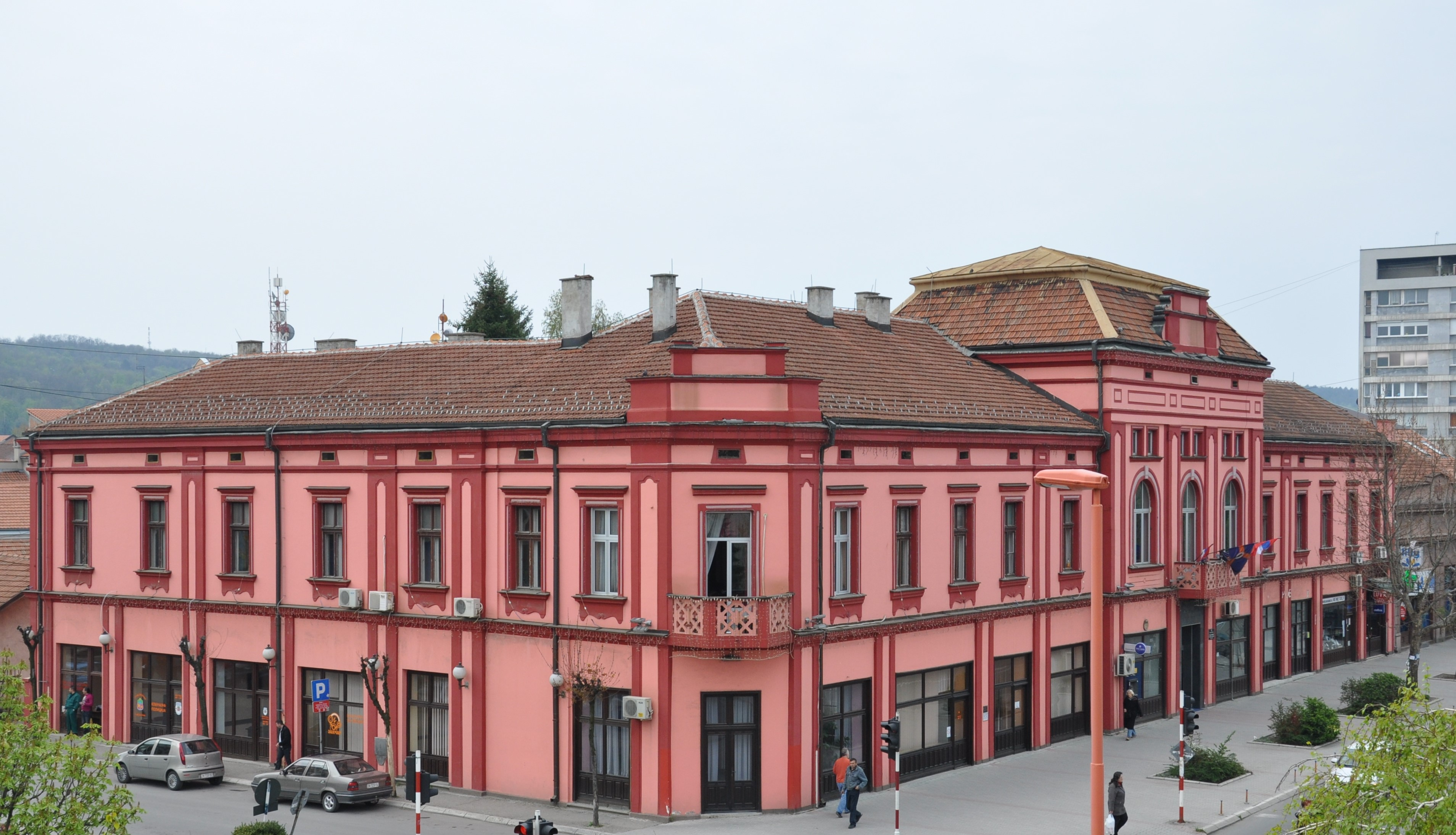
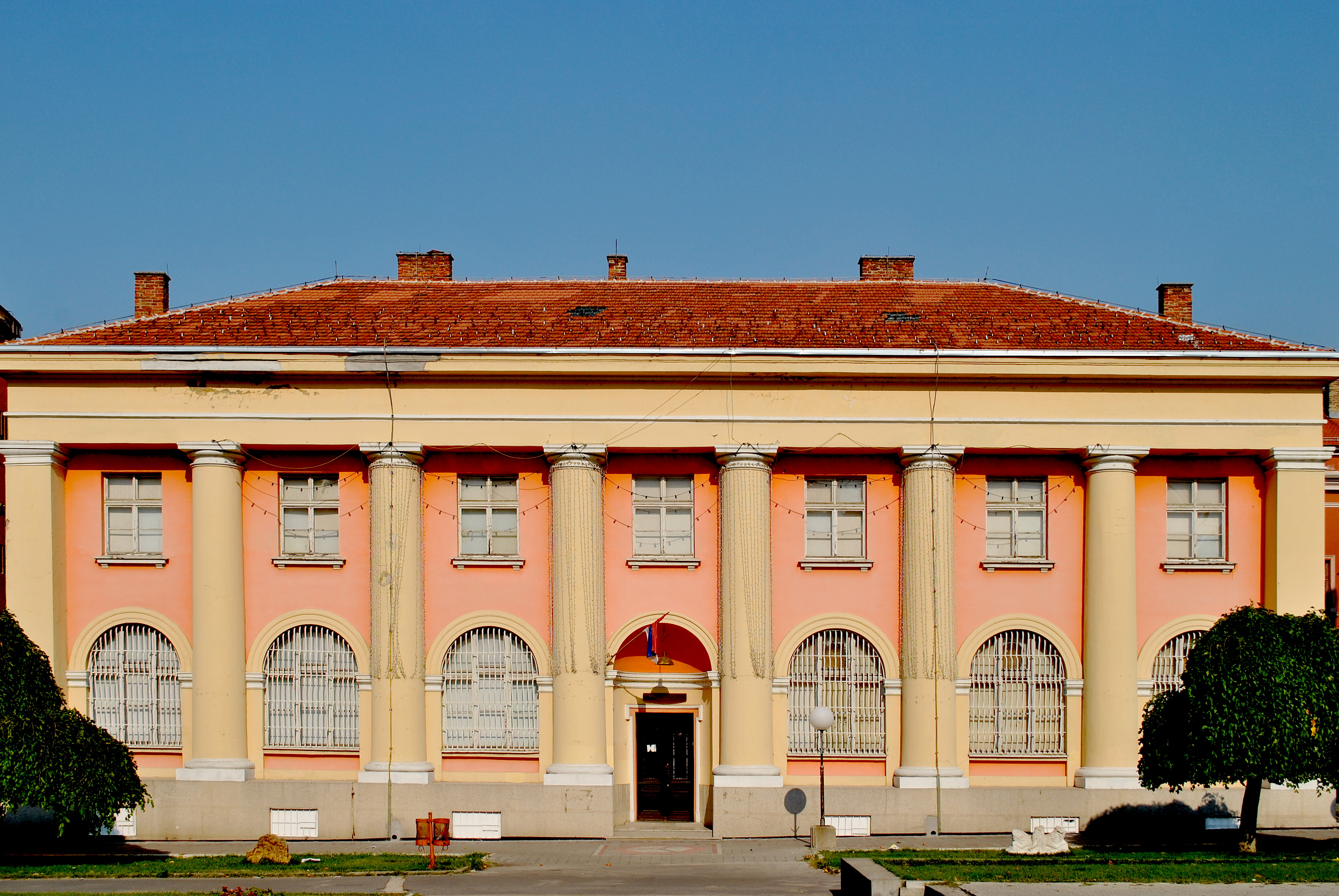
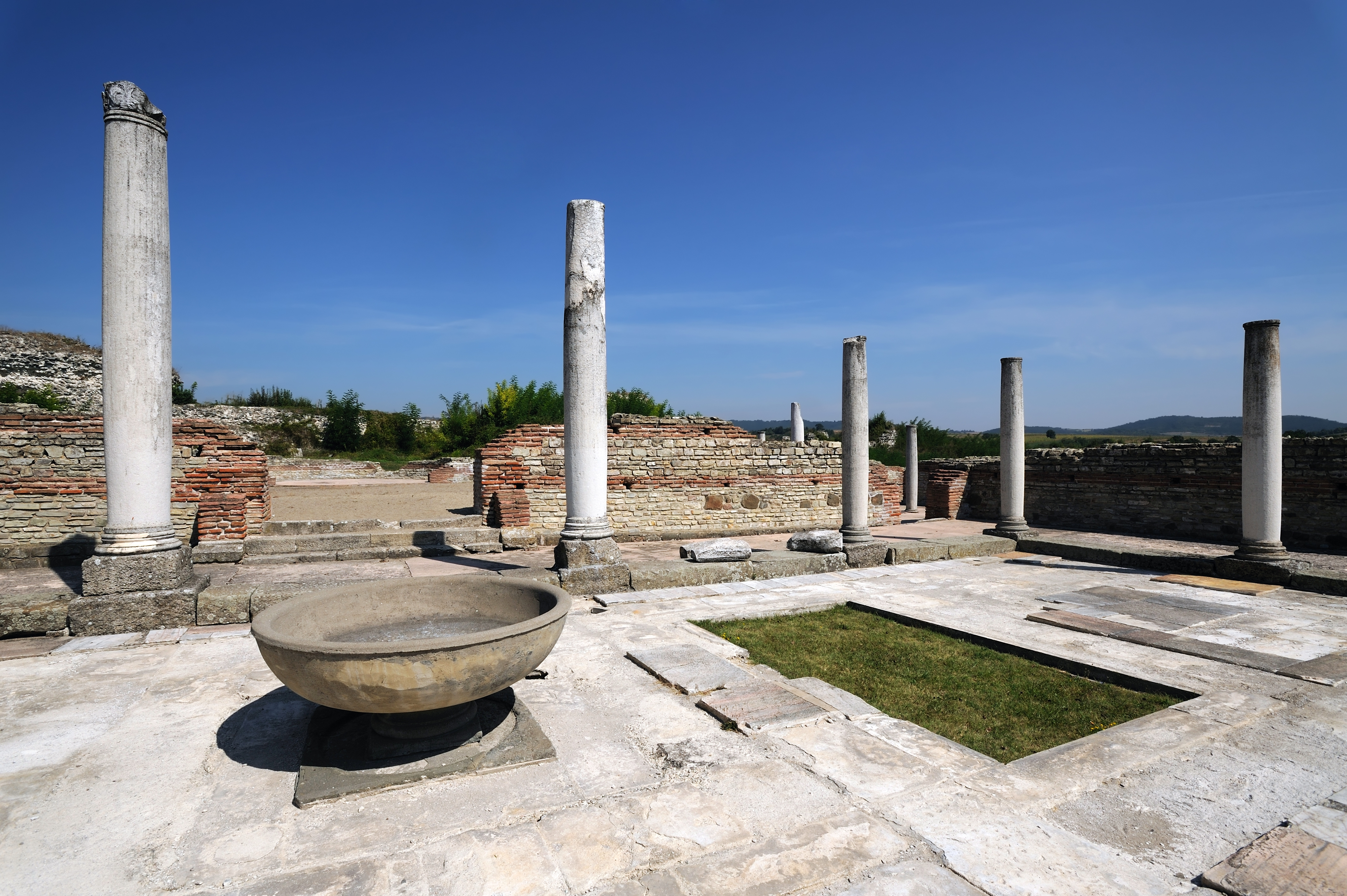
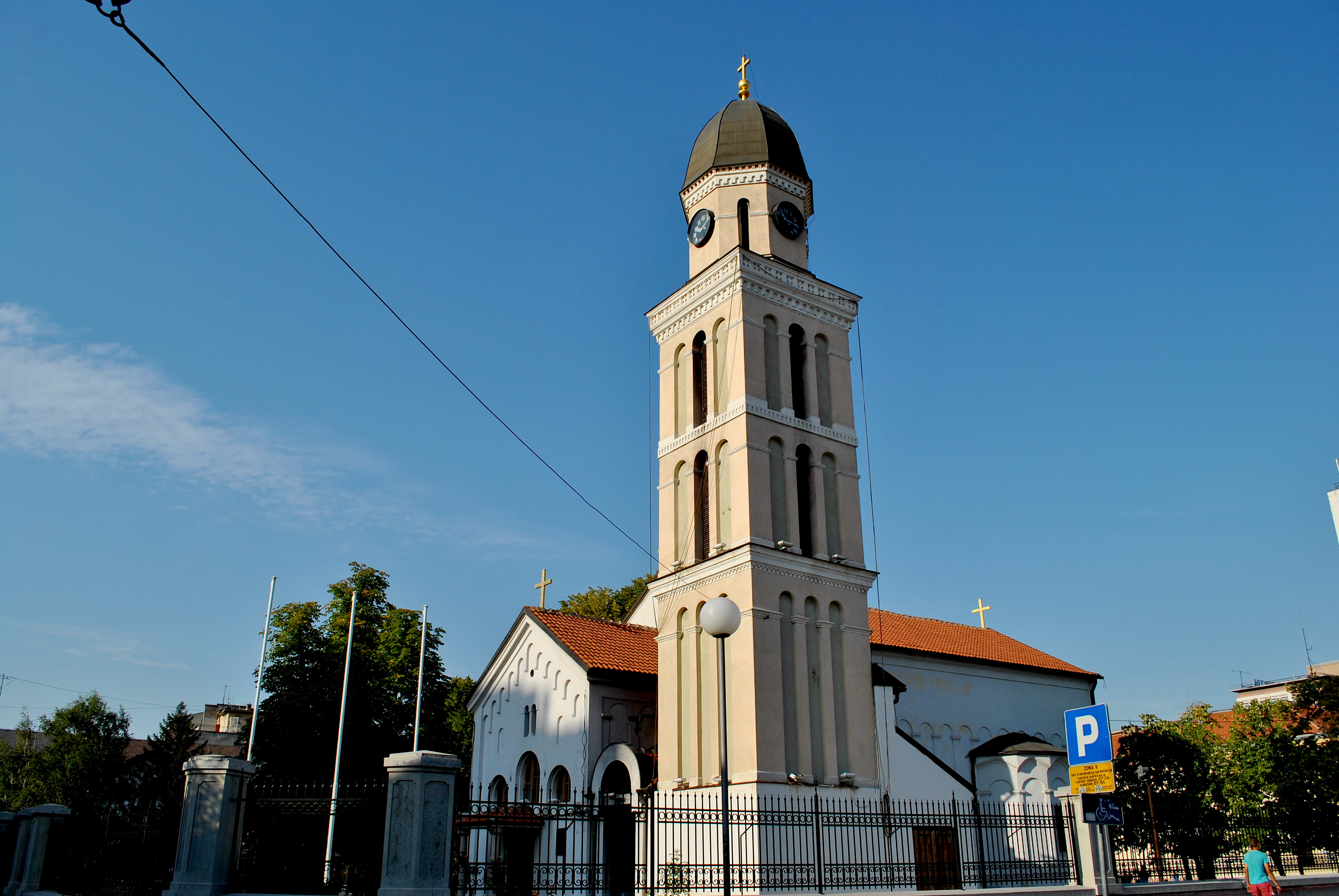
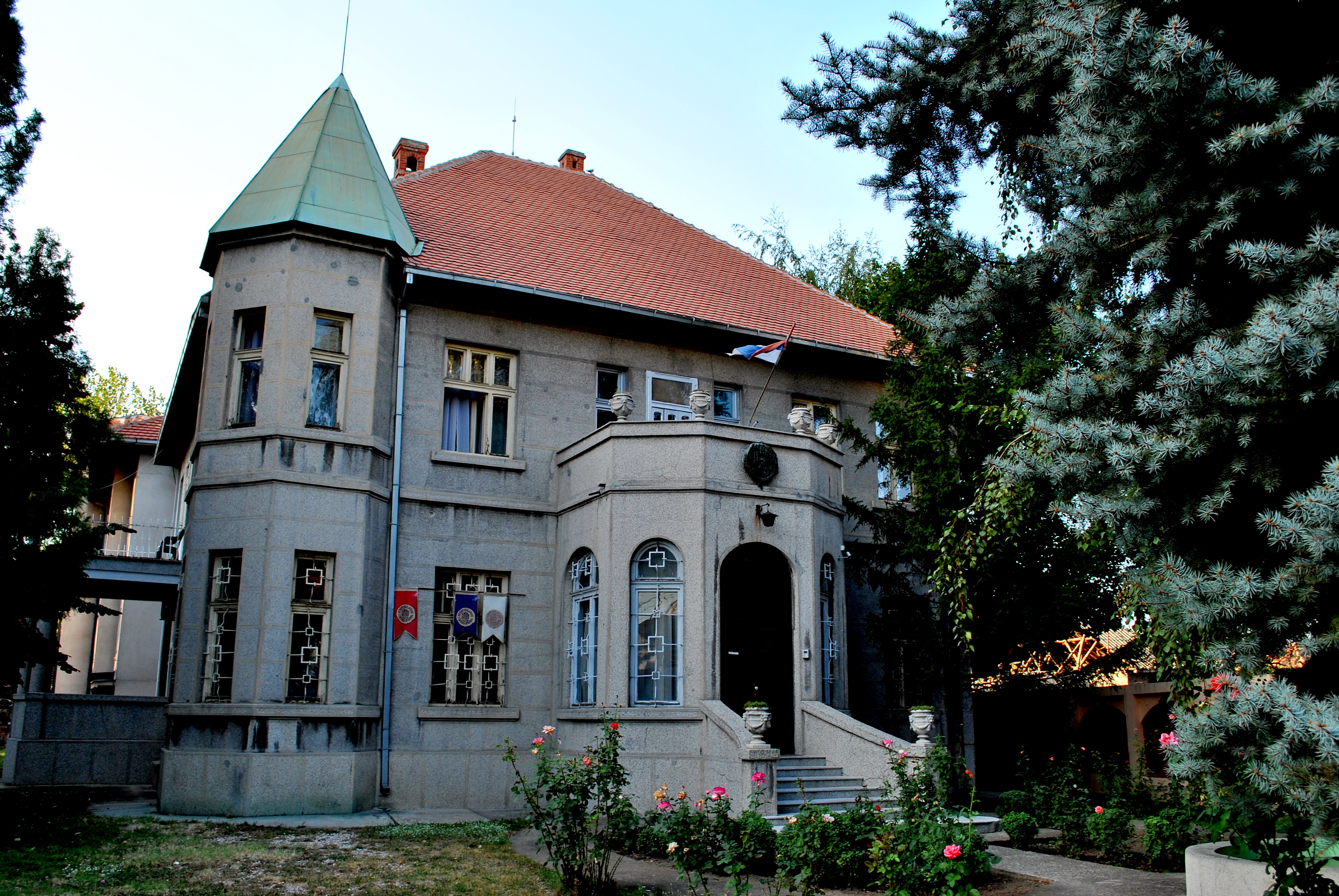
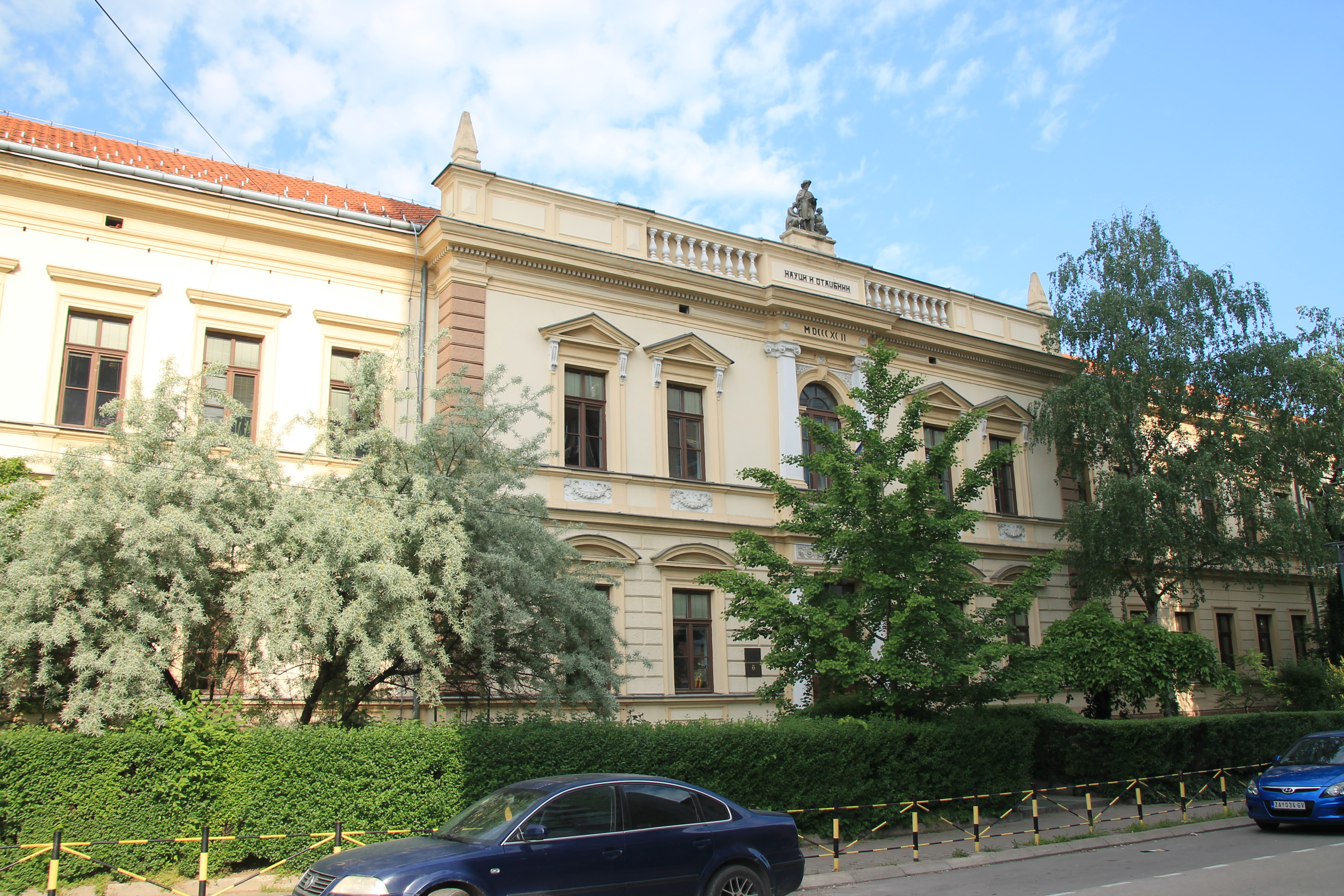
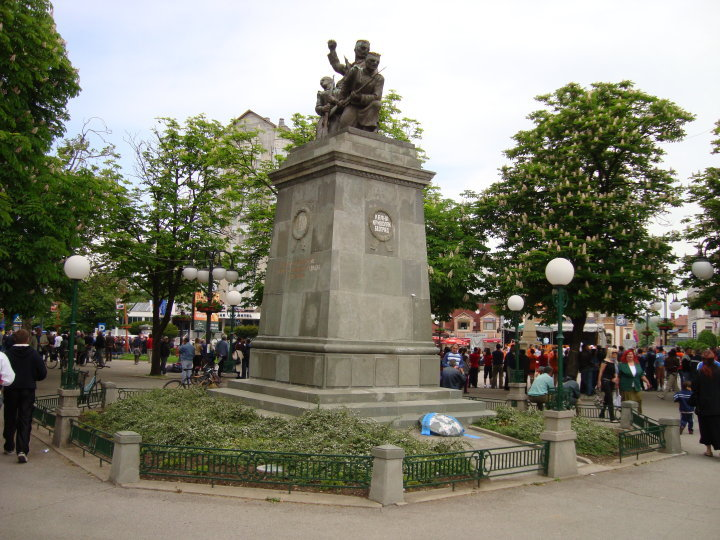
- Zaječar City Hall National Museum Archaeological site Gamzigrad Temple of the Most Holy Theotokos Historical Archive "Timočka krajina" of Zaječar Ljuba Nešić elementary school Zaječar Central Park

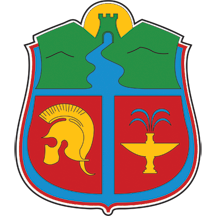
- Coat of arms

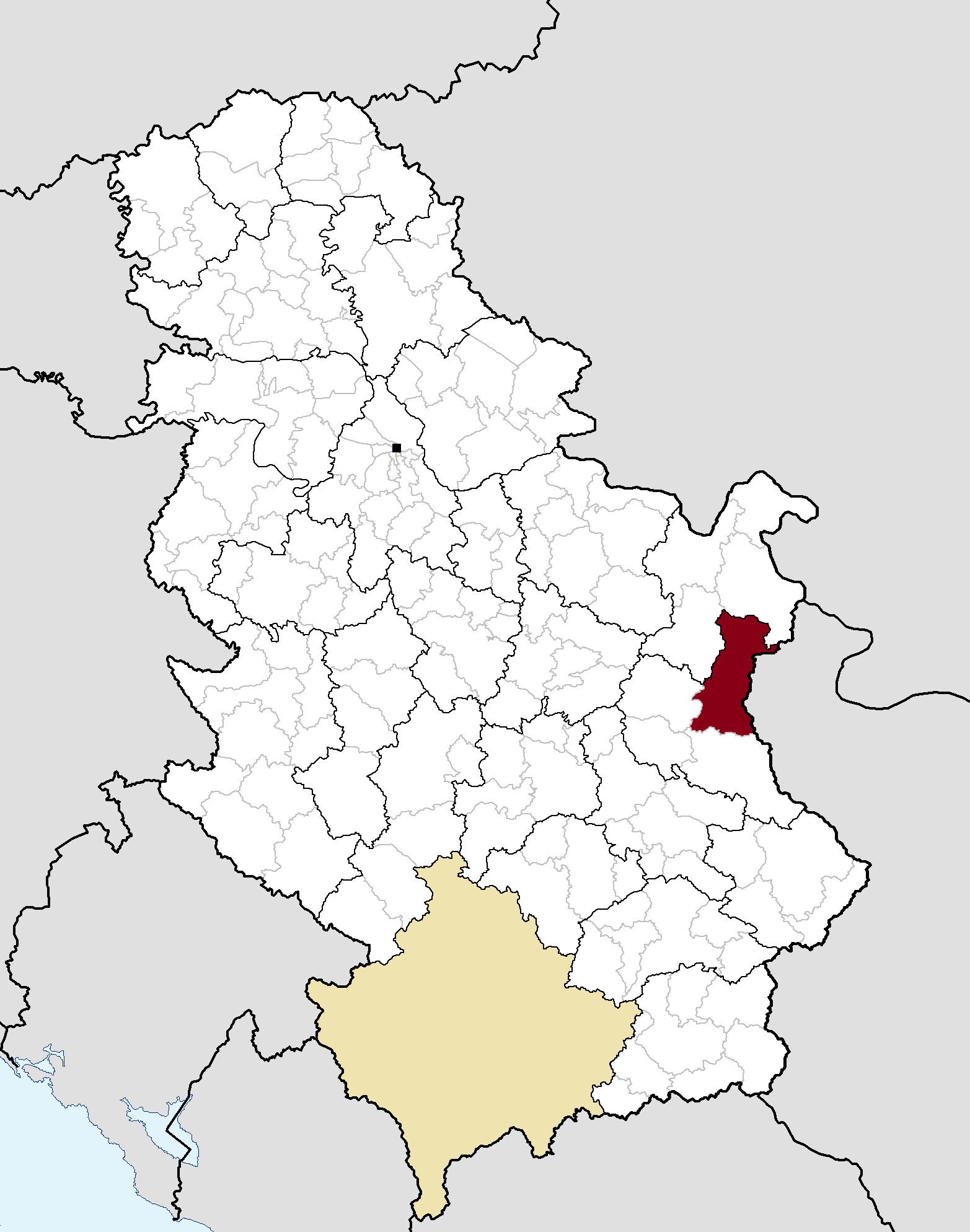
- Location of the city of Zaječar within Serbia
- Coordinates: 43°55′N 22°18′E
- Country: Serbia
- Region: Southern and Eastern Serbia
- District: Zaječar
- Settlements: 41

Government
  - Mayor: Boško Ničić (SNS)

Area
  - Urban: 97 km^{2} (37 sq mi)
  - Administrative: 1,069 km^{2} (413 sq mi)
- Elevation: 134 m (440 ft)

Population (2022 census)
  - Urban: 32,448
  - Urban density: 330/km^{2} (870/sq mi)
  - Administrative: 48,621
- Time zone: UTC+1 (CET)
  - Summer (DST): UTC+2 (CEST)
- Postal code: 19000
- Area code: +381(0)19
- Car plates: ZA
- Official languages: Serbian
- Website: www.zajecar.info

Zaječar (Serbian Cyrillic: Зајечар, pronounced [zâjɛtʃar]; Romanian: Zaicear or Zăiceari) is a city and the administrative center of the Zaječar District in eastern Serbia. According to the 2022 census, the city administrative area had a population of 48,621 inhabitants. Zaječar is widely known for its rock music festival Gitarijada and for the ZALET festival dedicated to contemporary art. Roman Emperor Galerius was born in Gamzigrad, near Zaječar, where he built the city of Felix Romuliana.

== Name ==
In Serbian, the city is known as Zaječar (Зајечар); in Romanian as Zaicear, Zăiicer (archaic name), Zăiceri, Zăicear or Zăiceari; in Macedonian as Заечар and in Bulgarian as Зайчар (Zaychar).

The origin of the name is from the Torlak dialect name for "hare" = zajec / зајец (in all other Serbian dialects it is zec / зец, while in Bulgarian it is заек / zaek"). It means "the man who breeds and keeps hares".

Folk etymology in Romanian, gives "Zăiicer" as meaning "the Gods are asking (for sacrifice)".

Early renderings of the city in English used Saitchar.

== History ==
=== Ancient ===
Three Roman Emperors were born in the area of the modern city of Zaječar: Galerius (r. 293–311), Maximinus (r. 305–312) and Licinius (r. 308–324).

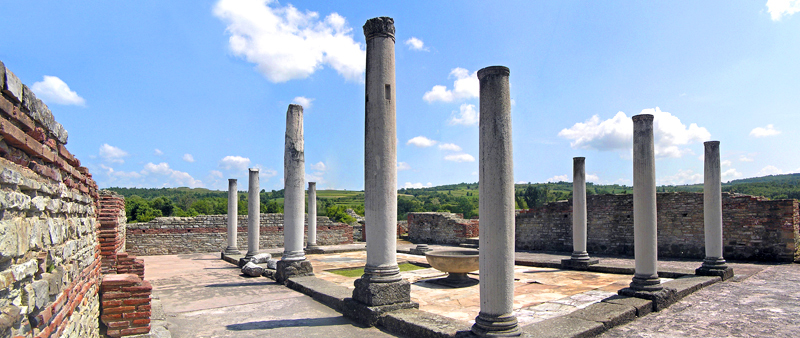
Felix Romuliana, now Gamzigrad

The Late Roman fortified palace compound and memorial complex of Gamzigrad-Romuliana at the outskirts of Zaječar was commissioned by Emperor Caius Valerius Galerius Maximianus, in the late 3rd and early 4th century. It was known as Felix Romuliana, named after the Emperor's mother Romula. The site consists of fortifications, the palace in the north-western part of the complex, basilicas, temples, hot baths, memorial complex, and a tetrapylon. The site offers a unique testimony of the Roman building tradition marked by the ideology of the period of the Second Tetrarchy. The group of buildings is also unique in its intertwining of ceremonial and memorial functions. The relation between two spatial ensembles in this site is stressed by the tetrapylon which is placed on the crossroads between the worldly fortification and palace on the one side and the other-worldly mausoleums and consecration monuments on the other.

=== Middle Ages ===
Slavs entered the region during the 7th century, and the tribe living in the area was called Timočani. During the Middle Ages, the area of Zaječar was contested between Bulgaria, Hungary and Serbia. During periods in the 9th-11th centuries and the 13th century the territory of modern-day Zaječar was a part of the Bulgarian Empire. It finally fell under Ottoman rule during the first half of the 15th century. The oldest preserved rendering of Zaječar listed in an Ottoman defter dates from 1466. At the time, there were only eight extended families (zadrugas) living there.

=== Modern ===
In the First Serb Uprising, Hajduk Veljko Petrović liberated the area from Ottoman rule in 1806. The Ottomans retook the area in 1813 but finally ceded it to Serbia in 1833.

The population of the city and of the area to the south of it was partly Bulgarian, as the Serbian ethnographer Milan Đ. Milićević recognized. The city actively participated in the Serbo-Turkish War of 1876–1878. In 1883, it was partially engulfed in the famous Timok Uprising, a reaction against a governmental order to confiscate peasants' firearms and against a law replacing the militia with a standing army.

Bulgaria occupied Zaječar from 1915 to 1918, during the First World War. From 1929 to 1941, the city was part of the Morava Banovina of the Kingdom of Yugoslavia. The German army occupied Zaječar on 14 April 1941, during the Second World War; it was administered as part of the Territory of the Military Commander in Serbia from 22 April 1941. Zaječar was liberated on 7–8 October 1944 in a joint operation by Yugoslav Partisans and the Red Army.

== Geography ==
=== Climate ===
Zaječar has a humid continental climate (Köppen climate classification: Dfa), that's very close to a humid subtropical climate (Köppen climate classification: Cfa).

Climate data for Zaječar (1991–2020, extremes 1961–2020)
Month	Jan	Feb	Mar	Apr	May	Jun	Jul	Aug	Sep	Oct	Nov	Dec	Year
Record high °C (°F)	23.0 (73.4)	25.1 (77.2)	28.5 (83.3)	34.2 (93.6)	35.7 (96.3)	40.4 (104.7)	44.7 (112.5)	41.7 (107.1)	38.4 (101.1)	32.3 (90.1)	28.4 (83.1)	24.6 (76.3)	44.7 (112.5)
Mean daily maximum °C (°F)	4.9 (40.8)	7.7 (45.9)	13.0 (55.4)	18.7 (65.7)	23.7 (74.7)	27.8 (82.0)	30.2 (86.4)	30.3 (86.5)	24.6 (76.3)	17.9 (64.2)	10.6 (51.1)	5.6 (42.1)	17.9 (64.2)
Daily mean °C (°F)	−0.1 (31.8)	1.8 (35.2)	6.4 (43.5)	11.8 (53.2)	16.8 (62.2)	20.9 (69.6)	22.8 (73.0)	22.1 (71.8)	16.7 (62.1)	10.9 (51.6)	5.6 (42.1)	0.9 (33.6)	11.4 (52.5)
Mean daily minimum °C (°F)	−4.1 (24.6)	−2.9 (26.8)	0.4 (32.7)	4.8 (40.6)	9.6 (49.3)	13.2 (55.8)	14.6 (58.3)	14.2 (57.6)	10.1 (50.2)	5.7 (42.3)	1.7 (35.1)	−2.9 (26.8)	5.4 (41.7)
Record low °C (°F)	−29.0 (−20.2)	−25.6 (−14.1)	−17.5 (0.5)	−6.5 (20.3)	−1.5 (29.3)	1.8 (35.2)	5.0 (41.0)	4.3 (39.7)	−5.0 (23.0)	−8.8 (16.2)	−17.4 (0.7)	−22.2 (−8.0)	−29.0 (−20.2)
Average precipitation mm (inches)	43.6 (1.72)	40.4 (1.59)	44.9 (1.77)	49.9 (1.96)	61.0 (2.40)	60.3 (2.37)	61.8 (2.43)	46.8 (1.84)	45.9 (1.81)	53.5 (2.11)	47.6 (1.87)	54.7 (2.15)	610.4 (24.03)
Average precipitation days (≥ 0.1 mm)	11.2	9.9	11.1	11.5	12.6	9.9	8.3	6.7	8.7	9.6	10.7	11.2	121.4
Average snowy days	7.3	5.6	3.7	0.3	0.0	0.0	0.0	0.0	0.0	0.2	2.2	5.3	24.6
Average relative humidity (%)	79.6	75.3	69.6	68.2	69.9	68.0	64.4	65.8	71.1	78.0	81.3	81.6	72.7
Mean monthly sunshine hours	70.3	90.8	133.3	167.4	219.2	250.0	286.3	262.4	176.6	121.3	64.5	57.5	1,899.6
Source: Republic Hydrometeorological Service of Serbia

== Settlements ==
Aside from the urban area of Zaječar, the city administrative area includes the following settlements:

- Borovac
- Brusnik
- Velika Jasikova
- Veliki Izvor
- Veliki Jasenovac
- Vražogrnac
- Vrbica
- Gamzigrad
- Glogovica
- Gornja Bela Reka
- Gradskovo
- Grlište
- Grljan
- Dubočane
- Zagrađe
- Zvezdan
- Jelašnica
- Klenovac
- Koprivnica
- Lasovo
- Lenovac
- Leskovac
- Lubnica
- Mala Jasikova
- Mali Izvor
- Mali Jasenovac
- Marinovac
- Metriš
- Nikoličevo
- Planinica
- Prlita
- Rgotina
- Salaš
- Selačka
- Tabakovac
- Trnavac
- Halovo
- Čokonjar
- Šipikovo
- Šljivar

== Demographics ==
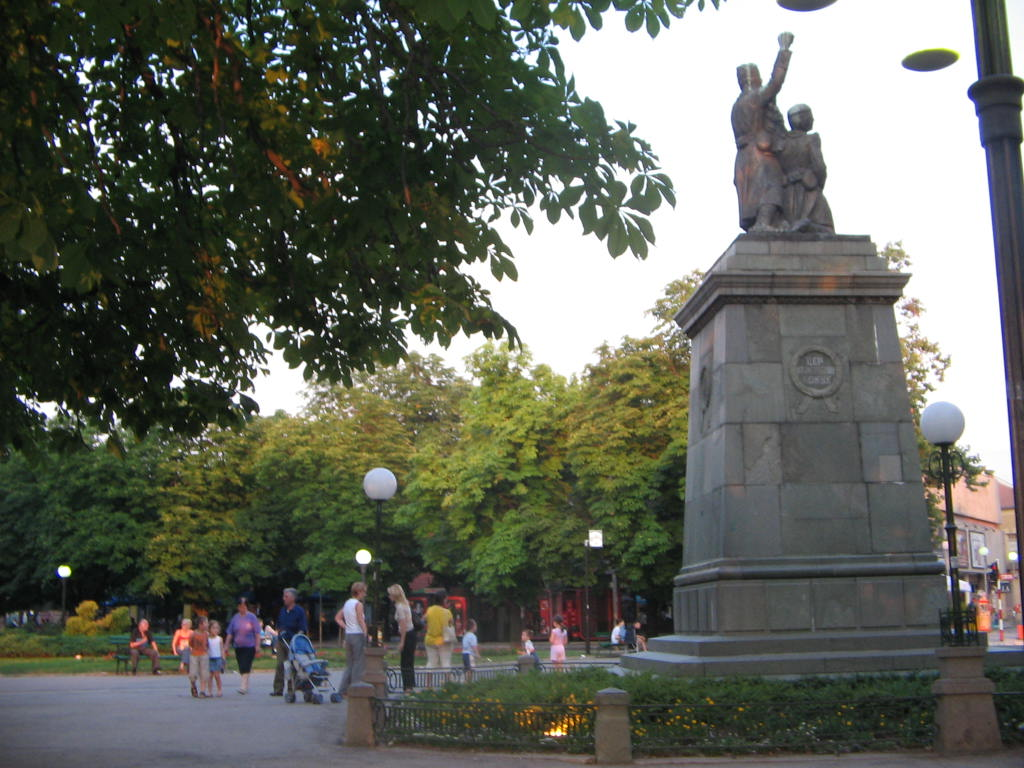
Park and monument

Historical population
Year	Pop.	±% p.a.
1948	62,887	—
1953	64,907	+0.63%
1961	68,616	+0.70%
1971	73,147	+0.64%
1981	76,681	+0.47%
1991	72,763	−0.52%
2002	65,969	−0.89%
2011	59,461	−1.15%
2022	47,991	−1.93%

According to the 2022 census, the City of Zaječar has a population of 47,991 inhabitants, while the urban area has 32,448 inhabitants. The city has an urban area of over 97 km^{2}.

=== Ethnic groups ===
The ethnic composition of the city:

Ethnic group	Population	%
Serbs	41,978	86.26%
Vlachs	1,476	4.80%
Romani	637	1.27%
Romanians	192	0.34%
Bulgarians	132	0.30%
Macedonians	91	0.25%
Montenegrins	44	0.16%
Yugoslavs	133	0.15%
Croats	49	0.12%
Albanians	27	0.07%
Muslims	22	0.05%
Gorani	26	0.05%
Slovenians	10	0.04%
Others	3,116	6.14%
Total	47,991	

== Economy ==
The following table gives a preview of total number of registered people employed in legal entities per their core activity (as of 2022):

Activity	Total
Agriculture, forestry and fishing	217
Mining and quarrying	440
Manufacturing	1,732
Electricity, gas, steam and air conditioning supply	222
Water supply; sewerage, waste management and remediation activities	231
Construction	441
Wholesale and retail trade, repair of motor vehicles and motorcycles	2,122
Transportation and storage	643
Accommodation and food services	442
Information and communication	160
Financial and insurance activities	201
Real estate activities	13
Professional, scientific and technical activities	377
Administrative and support service activities	263
Public administration and defense; compulsory social security	1,126
Education	963
Human health and social work activities	1,350
Arts, entertainment and recreation	197
Other service activities	246
Individual agricultural workers	411
Total	11,798

== Society and culture ==
=== Sport ===
Zaječar hosted 2006 Serbian triathlon championship. The city has two sport-recreation centers, "Popova plaža" and "SRC Kraljevica" home of ŽRK Zaječar, while a third, "Kotlujevac", is under reconstruction. Local football club FK Timok has competed in the second tiers of Serbian and Yugoslav football.

=== Theatre ===
Zaječar is home to the "Zoran Radmilović" theatre built 2 February 1947 under the name of the "Oblasno narodno pozorište". The first play ever performed in the new theatre was "Žita cvetaju". The theatre was renamed during its 45th (1992) anniversary as "Zoran Radmilović" to celebrate a famous and beloved actor who was born there. Every year, this theatre is home to the "Dani Zorana Radmilovića" art festival.

=== ZA*73T ===
The Festival of Contemporary Art ZALET (stylised as ZA*73T) organizes manifestations, such as exhibitions, concerts, literary evenings and experimental theater.

=== Gitarijada ===
Gitarijada (Serbian Cyrillic: Гитаријада, trans. Guitar fest) is a musical festival held during the summer in order to promote demo bands. Held since 1969, Gitarijada is one of the longest-lasting festivals in Serbia and in South Eastern Europe. The festival started its life in Zaječar during 1970. Some of notable bands from Serbia such as Bjesovi & Galija were winners in the Gitarijada competition during the '80s and '90s. The programme of the Gitarijada festival has several parts. Demo battles as a main item, with performances of artists and art exhibitions involving themes like rock, blues, metal and similar ones.

Many local bands from Zaječar have participated in past events:

Zlatni Prsti, Visoko Mišljenje, Zoster, Crna Ruža, Civili, Blood Eruption, Priručnik Janga Trovača, Hate-tech, Brain Damage, Plood, Mind Reflection, VIS Novi Dan, Huti Ota Tre...

=== Education ===
Elementary schools

- OŠ "Desanka Maksimović"
- OŠ "Ljuba Nešić"
- OŠ "Djura Jakšić"
- OŠ "Ljubica Radosavljević Nada"
- OŠ "Hajduk Veljko"
- OŠ "Vladislav Petković Dis"
- OŠ "Vuk Karadžić"
- OŠ "Jeremija Ilić Jegor"
- OŠ "Dositej Obradović"
- OŠ "15.maj"
- OŠ "Jovan Jovanovic Zmaj"

High schools

- Gymnasium (since 1836)
- Medical Assistant/Nurse high school
- Technical high school
- Business Assistant and Accountancy high school
- Machine technician high school
- Secondary Music School

University education

The city is the seat of the Megatrend University Faculty of Management; Business School of Management.

== Twin cities ==
Zaječar is twinned with:

- Vidin, Bulgaria
- Berkovitsa, Bulgaria
- Calafat, Romania

== Notable people ==
The people listed below were born in, residents of, or otherwise closely associated with the city of Zaječar area.

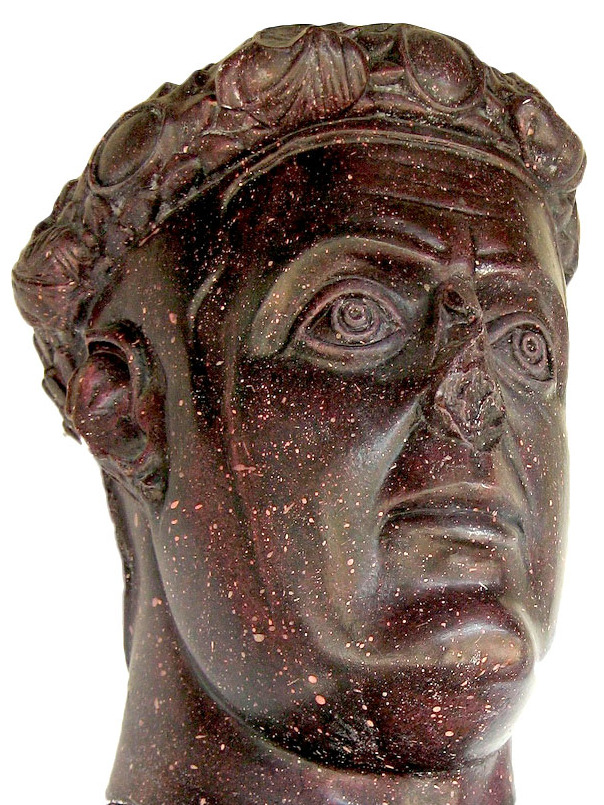
Porphyry bust of Emperor Galerius, found in 1993 at Gamzigrad and held at the National Museum in Zaječar

- Galerius, Roman Emperor, born in, or of a family origin from, Gamzigrad, near Zaječar, where he built the city of Felix Romuliana.
- Licinius, Roman Emperor, born in Moesia, near Zaječar
- Vetranio, Roman Emperor, born in Moesia, near Zaječar
- Hajduk Veljko Petrović, one of the leaders of the First Serbian Uprising, was born in Lenovac near Zaječar c. 1780.
- Nikola Pašić, a Serbian and Yugoslav politician and diplomat, was born in 1845 in Veliki Izvor, then in the vicinity, and today a suburb, of Zaječar.
- Đorđe Genčić, Interior Minister during the reign of Alexander I of Serbia, Mayor of Niš in 1894–1899, was born in Zaječar. In his family house in Belgrade the Nikola Tesla Museum is housed today.
- Svetozar Marković, political theorist and activist, was born in Zaječar in 1846.
- Simo Matavulj, novelist and short story writer, briefly taught at the Zaječar gymnasium
- Zoran Radmilović, comedy and character actor (theatre), was born in Zaječar in 1933.
- Mirko Cvetković, Ph.D., Prime Minister of Serbia 2008–2012
- Ivana Sert, Serbian-Turkish TV personality, model, and fashion designer.
- Slobodan Misic-Brenda, a Canadian handball coach, was born in Brusnik near Zaječar in 1942.
- Dragan Stanković, volleyball player, European champion and World championships bronze medalist.
- Boban Marjanović, basketball player for Houston Rockets of the National Basketball Association (NBA) and Serbian national basketball team.
- Srđan Pilipović, archer and medalist at the 2024 European Indoor Archery Championships.

== See also ==
- Zaječar District
- List of places in Serbia
