= Lozno =

Lozno may refer to:

- Lozno, Kraljevo
- Lozno, Kyustendil Province, Bulgaria
