= Bzovik (Kraljevo) =

Coordinates: 43°25′N 20°26′E

Bzovik Бзовик (Serbian)
- Village (Selo)
- Interactive map of Bzovik
- Country: Serbia
- District: Raška District
- Municipality: Kraljevo

Population (2002)
  - Total: 205
- Time zone: UTC+1 (CET)
  - Summer (DST): UTC+2 (CEST)

Bzovik is a village in the municipality of Kraljevo, western-central Serbia. According to the 2002 census, the village had a population of 205 people.
