= Trgovište (Kraljevo) =

Coordinates: 43°48′N 20°42′E

Trgovište Трговиште (Serbian)
- Village (Selo)
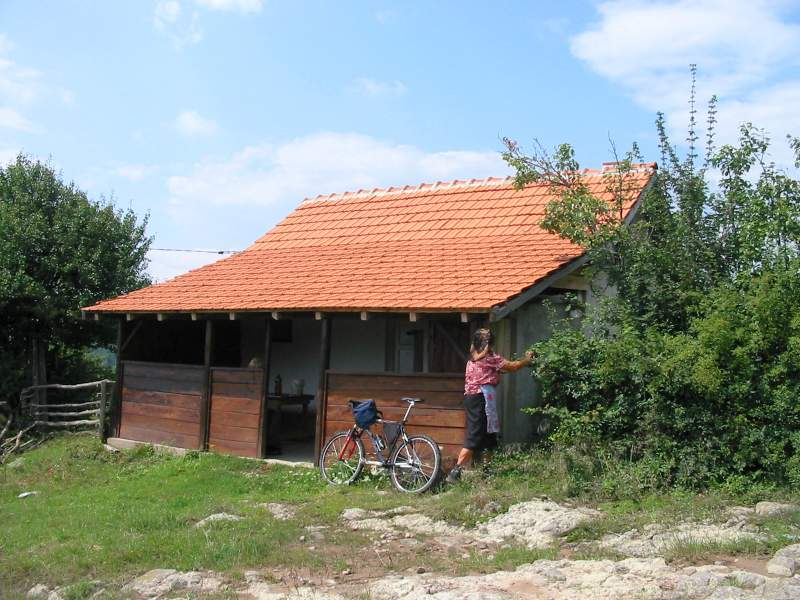
- Interactive map of Trgovište
- Country: Serbia
- Municipality: Kraljevo
- Time zone: UTC+1 (CET)
  - Summer (DST): UTC+2 (CEST)

Trgovište is a village situated in Kraljevo municipality in Serbia.
