= Zakuta =

Coordinates: 43°50′N 20°48′E

Zakuta Закута (Serbian)
- Village (Selo)
- Interactive map of Zakuta
- Country: Serbia
- District: Raška District
- Municipality: Kraljevo
- Time zone: UTC+1 (CET)
  - Summer (DST): UTC+2 (CEST)

Zakuta is a village situated in Kraljevo municipality in Serbia.
