= Meljanica =

Coordinates: 43°36′N 20°39′E

Meljanica Мељаница (Serbian)
- Village (Selo)
- Interactive map of Meljanica
- Country: Serbia
- District: Raška District
- Municipality: Kraljevo
- Time zone: UTC+1 (CET)
  - Summer (DST): UTC+2 (CEST)

Meljanica is a village situated in Kraljevo municipality in Serbia.
