= Jarčujak =

Coordinates: 43°44′N 20°37′E

Jarčujak Јарчујак (Serbian)
- Suburb
- Interactive map of Jarčujak
- Country: Serbia
- District: Raška District
- Municipality: Kraljevo
- Time zone: UTC+1 (CET)
  - Summer (DST): UTC+2 (CEST)

Jarčujak is a suburb situated in Kraljevo municipality in Serbia.
