= Petropolje =

Coordinates: 43°49′N 20°48′E

Petropolje Петропоље (Serbian)
- Village (Selo)
- Interactive map of Petropolje
- Country: Serbia
- District: Raška District
- Municipality: Kraljevo
- Time zone: UTC+1 (CET)
  - Summer (DST): UTC+2 (CEST)

Petropolje is a village situated in the Kraljevo municipality of Serbia.
