= Kamenjani =

Kamenjani Камењани (Serbian)
- Village (Selo)
- Location within Serbia
- Coordinates: 43°28′N 20°34′E
- Country: Serbia
- Municipality: Kraljevo
- Time zone: UTC+1 (CET)
  - Summer (DST): UTC+2 (CEST)

Kamenjani is a village situated in Kraljevo municipality in Serbia.
