= Roćevići =

Coordinates: 43°42′N 20°29′E

Roćevići Роћевићи (Serbian)
- Village (Selo)
- Interactive map of Roćevići
- Country: Serbia
- District: Raška District
- Municipality: Kraljevo
- Time zone: UTC+1 (CET)
  - Summer (DST): UTC+2 (CEST)

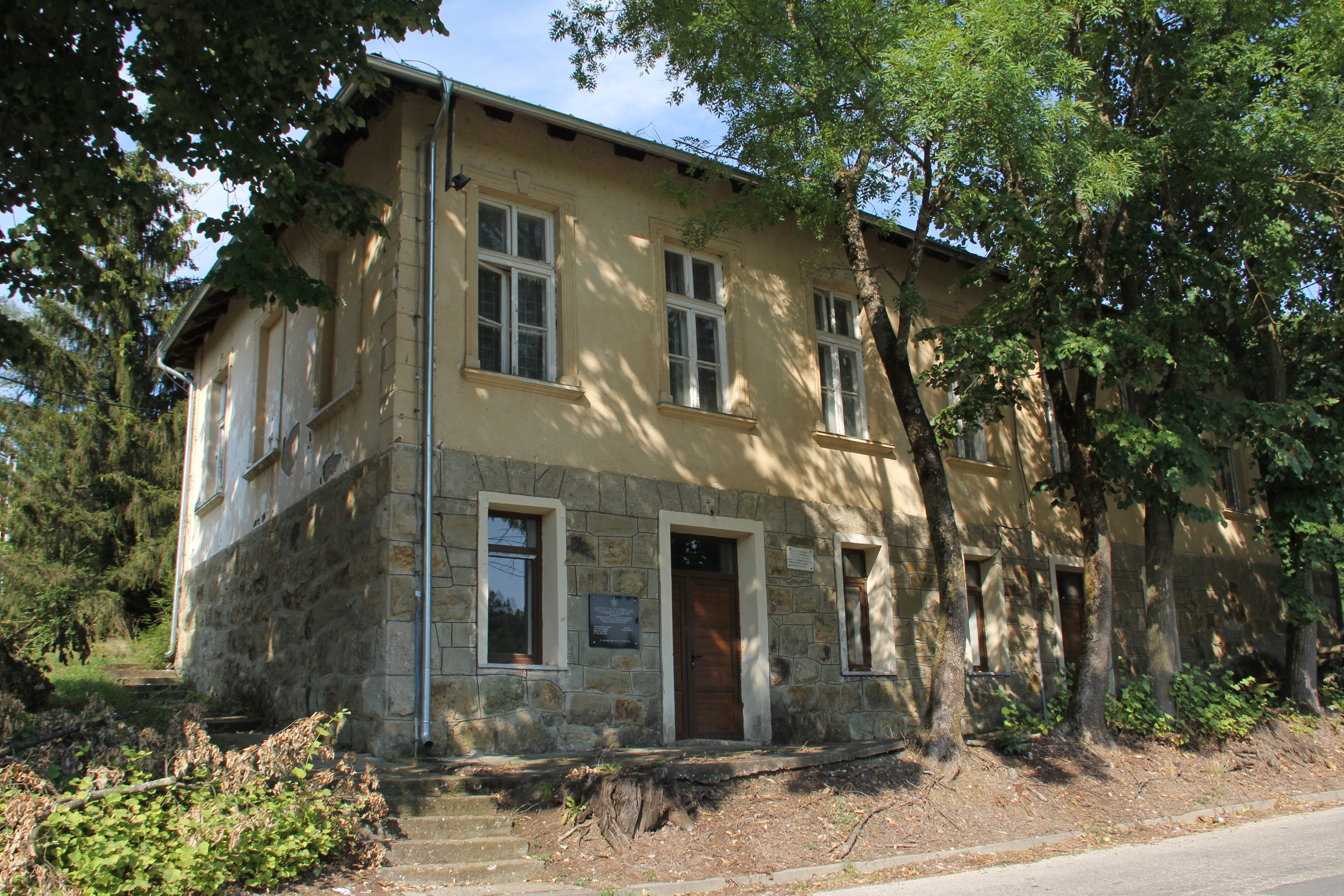
A building in Roćevići

Roćevići is a village situated in Kraljevo municipality in Serbia.
