= Musina Reka =

Coordinates: 43°44′44″N 20°35′42″E

Musina Reka Мусина Река (Serbian)
- Village (Selo)
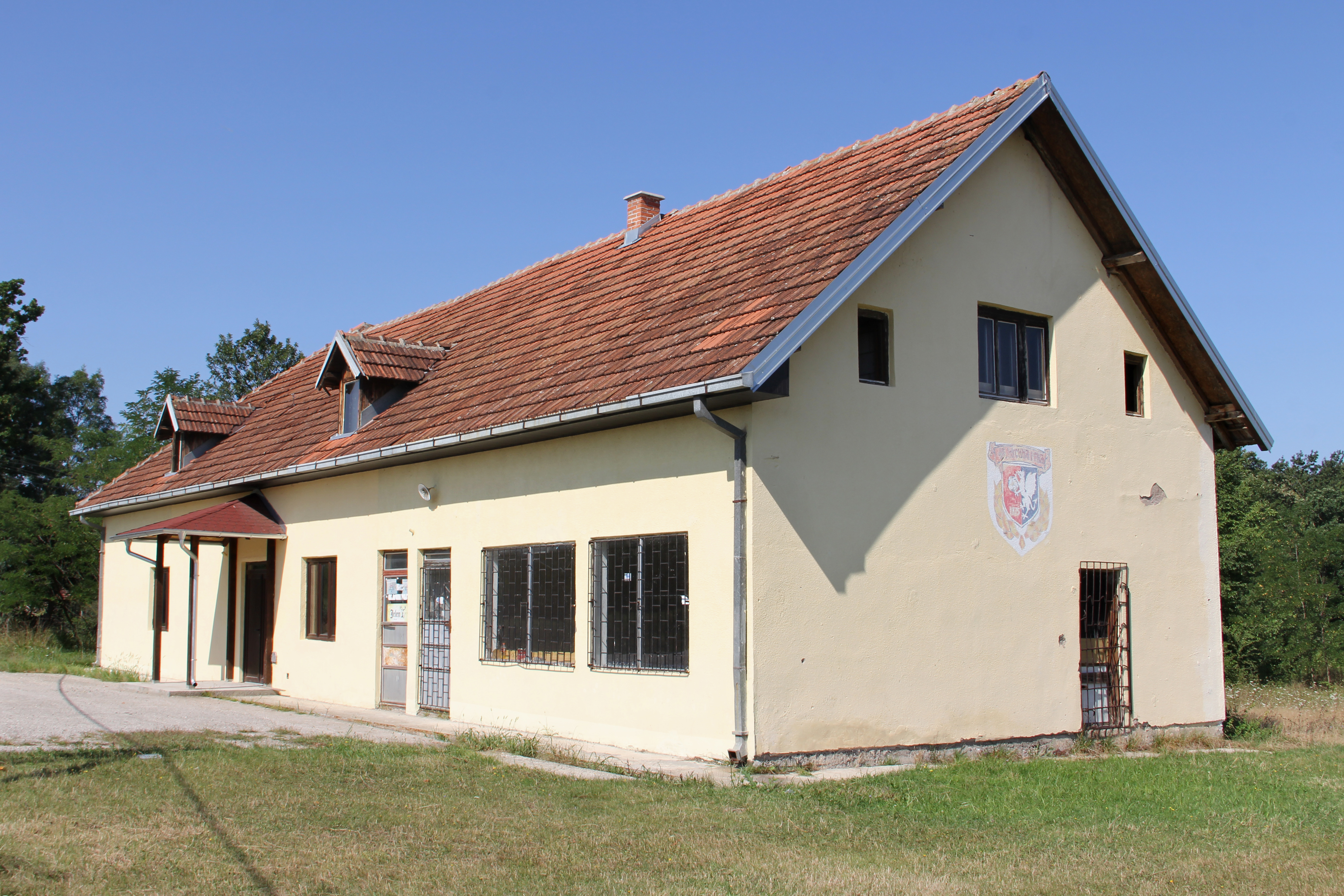
- The village of Musina Reka (Kraljevo), Serbia.
- Interactive map of Musina Reka
- Country: Serbia
- District: Raška District
- Municipality: Kraljevo
- Time zone: UTC+1 (CET)
  - Summer (DST): UTC+2 (CEST)

Musina Reka is a village situated in Kraljevo municipality in Serbia.
