= Kraljevo =

Kraljevo Краљево (Serbian)
- City
- City of Kraljevo
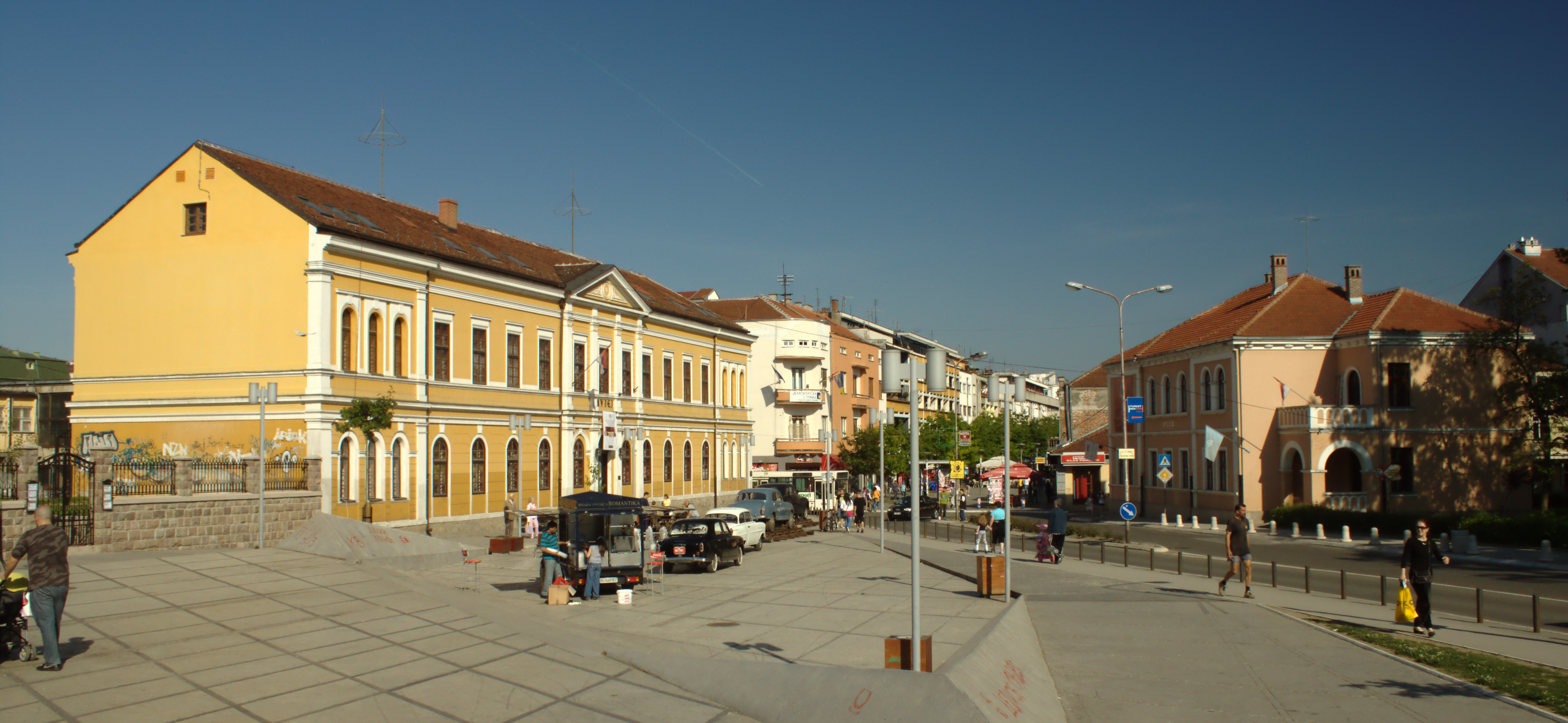
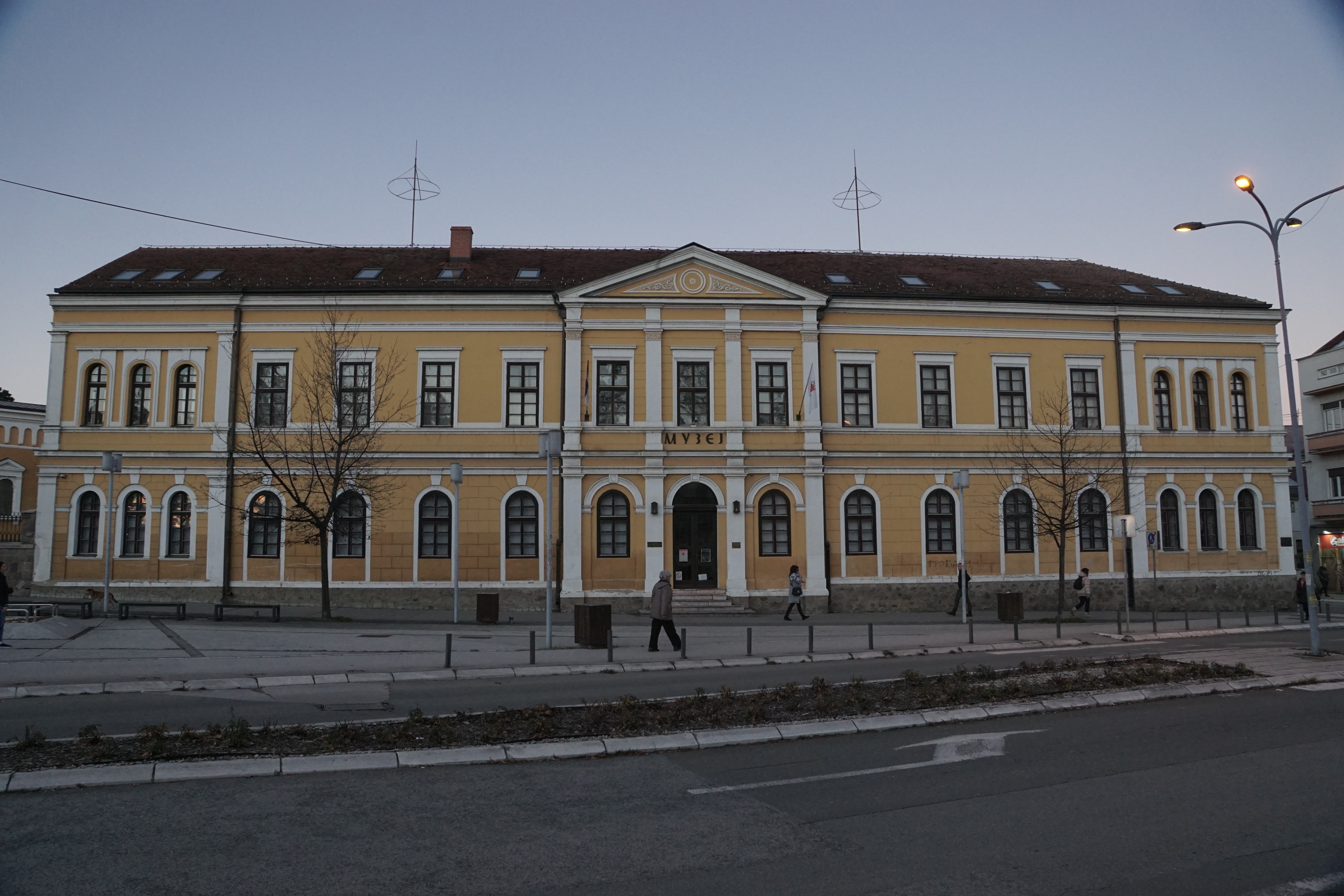
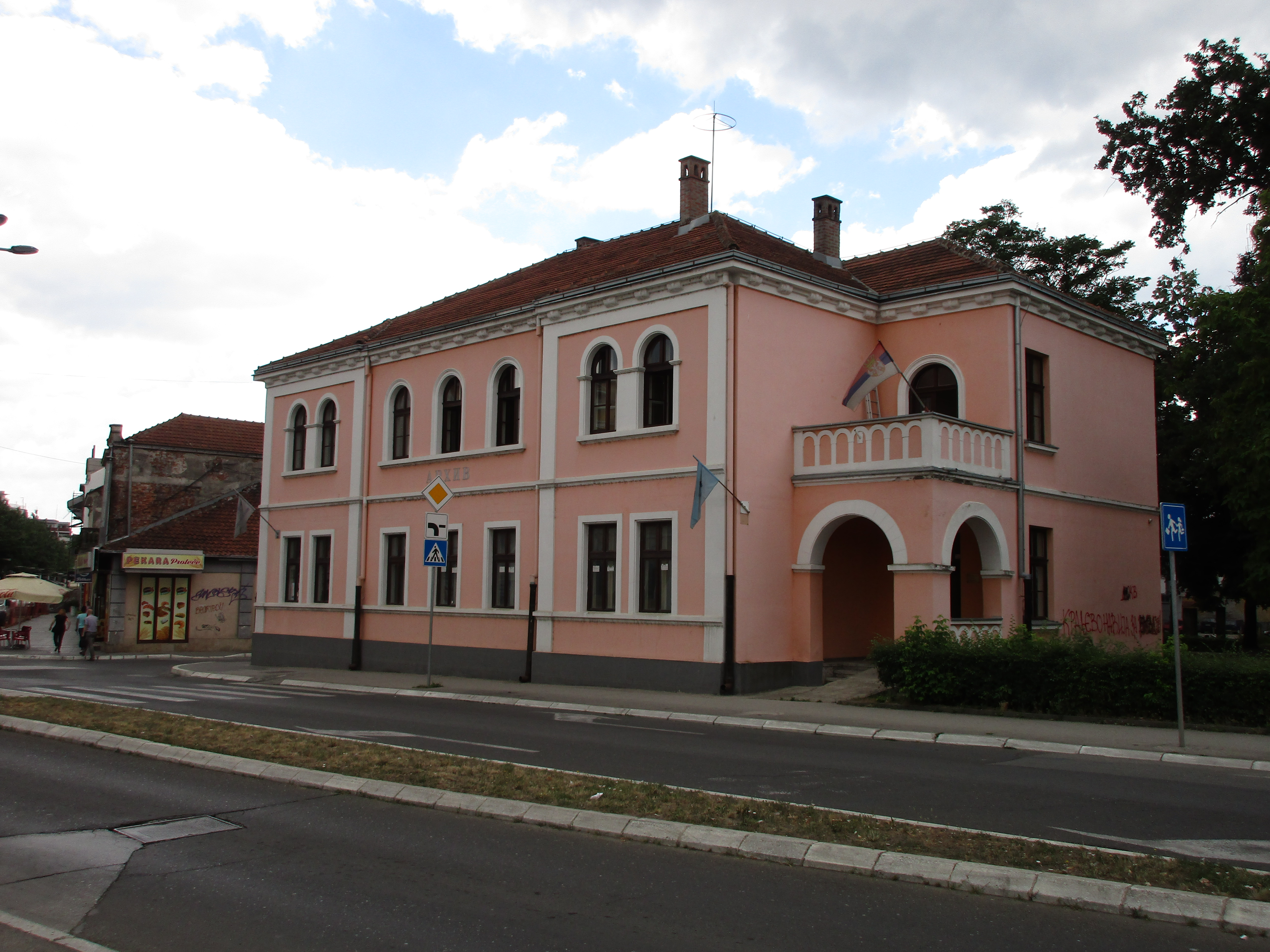
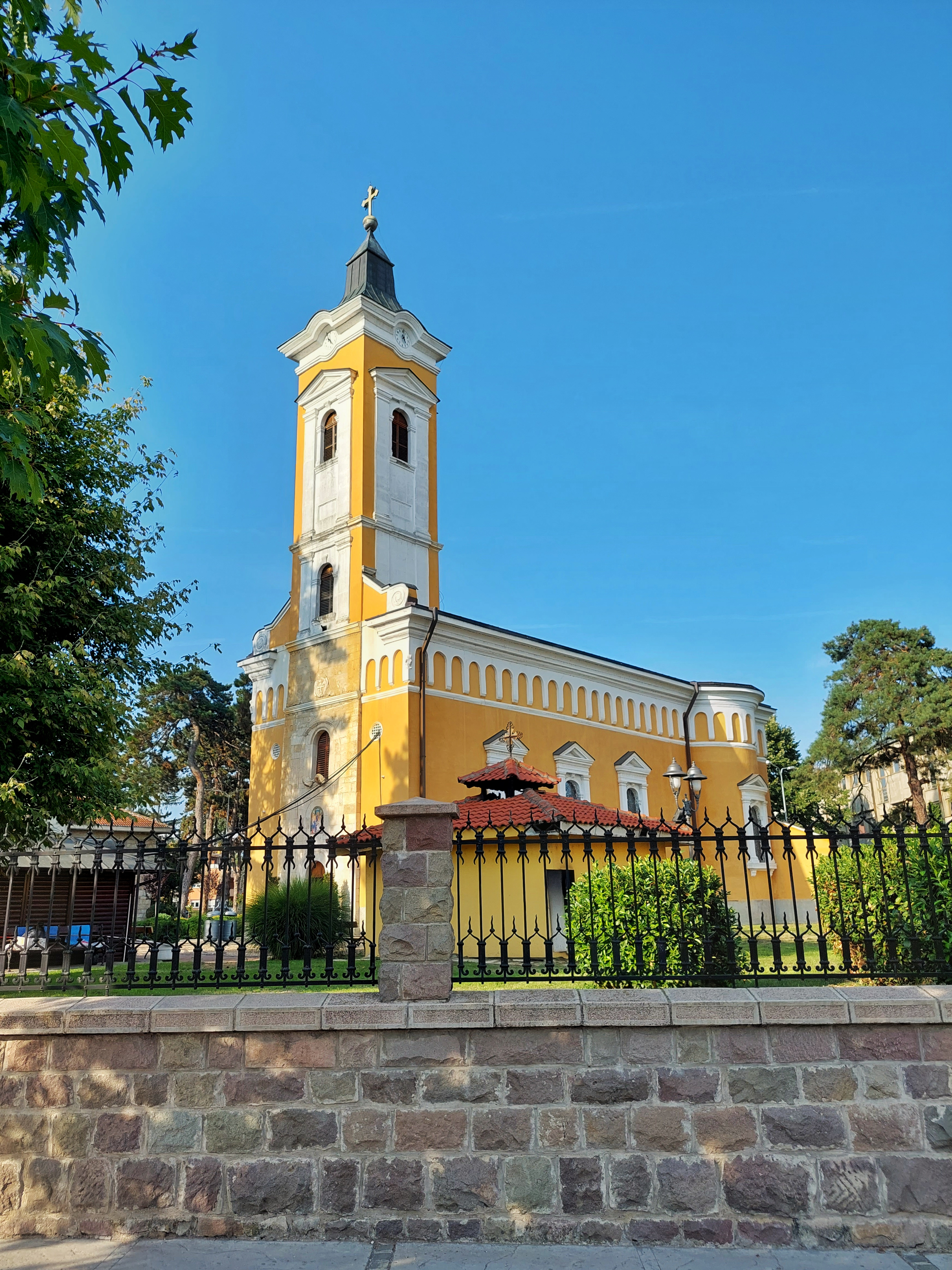
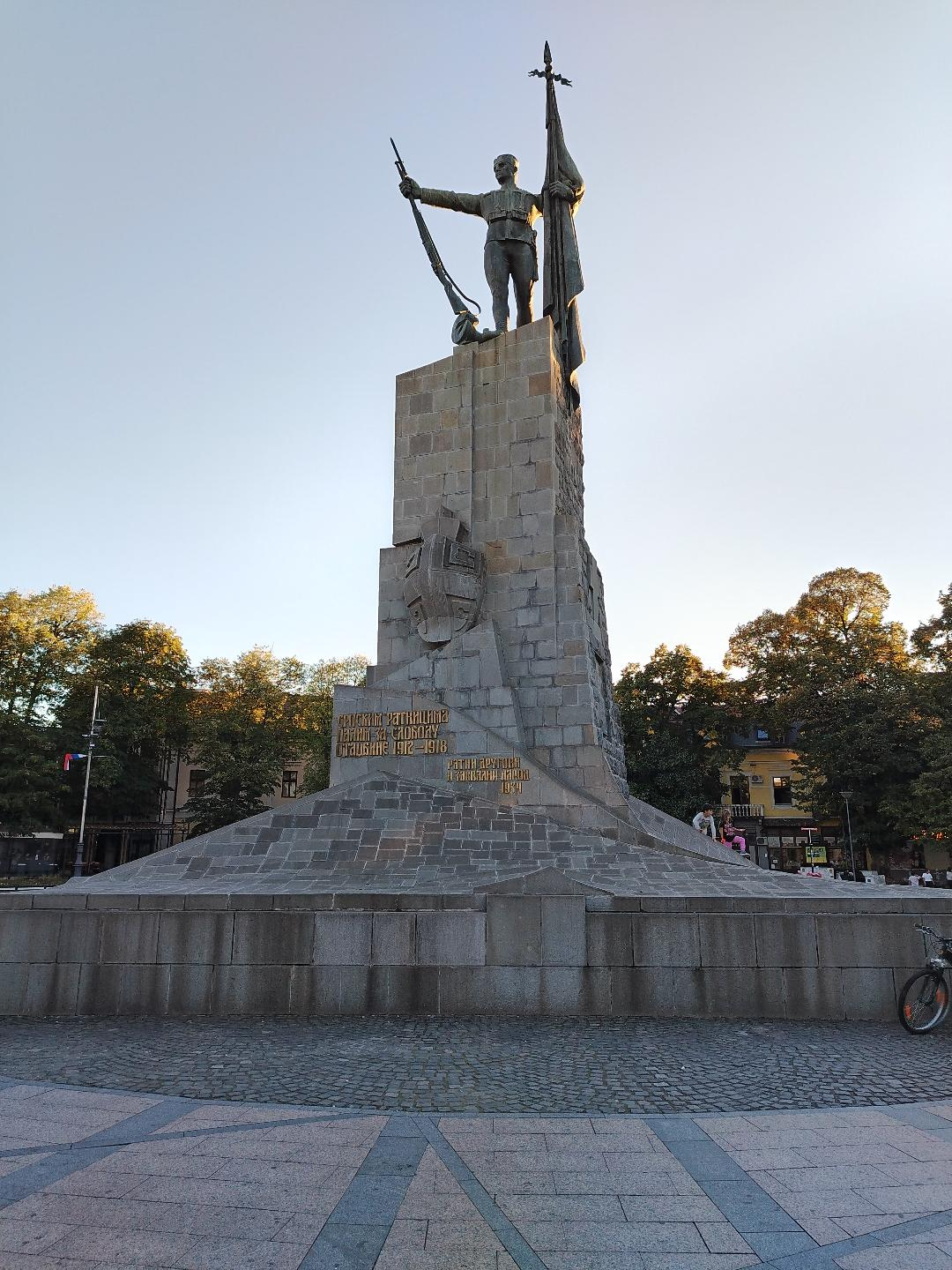
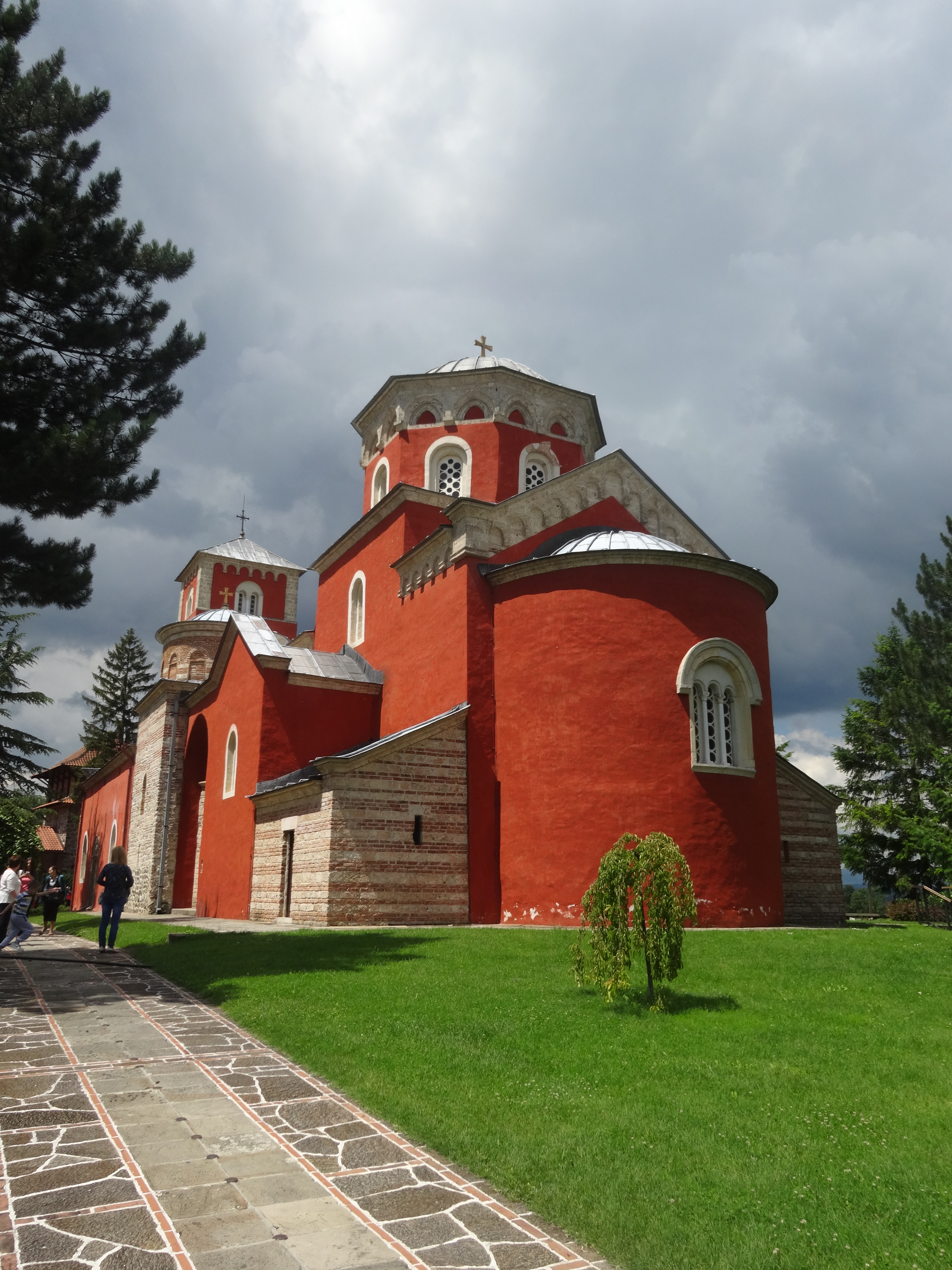
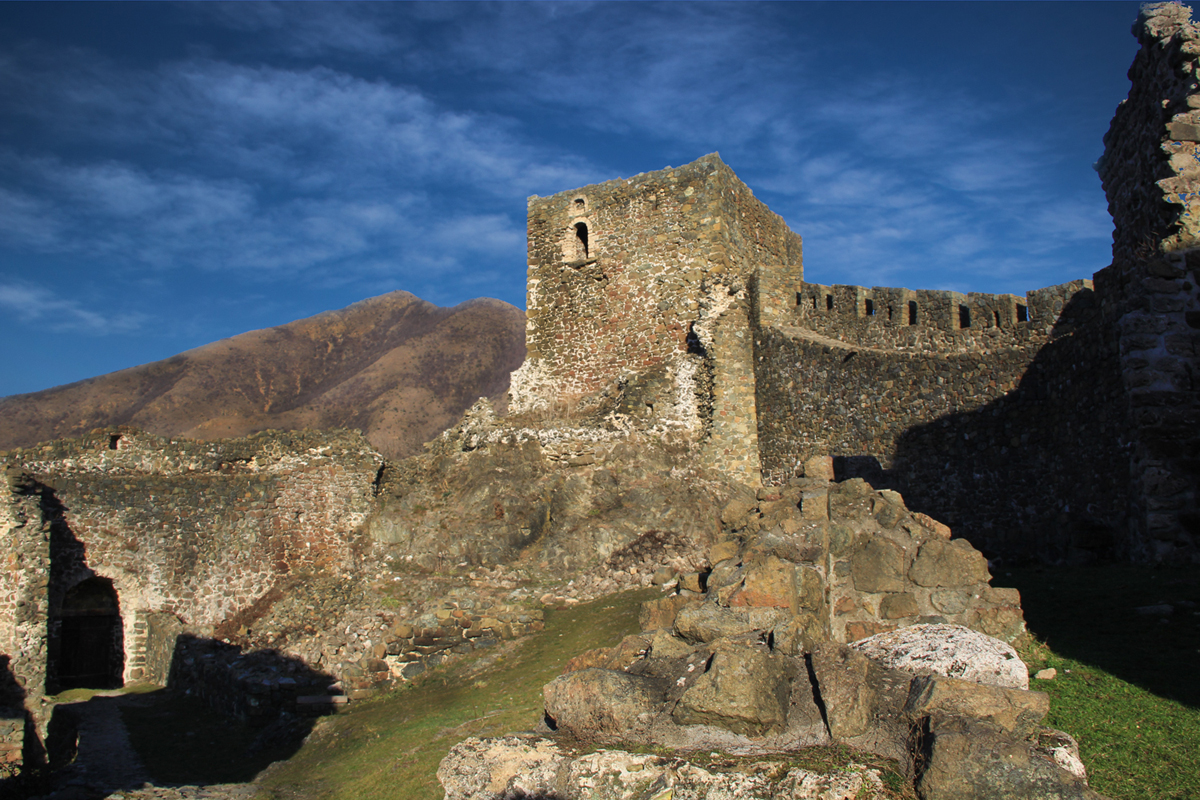
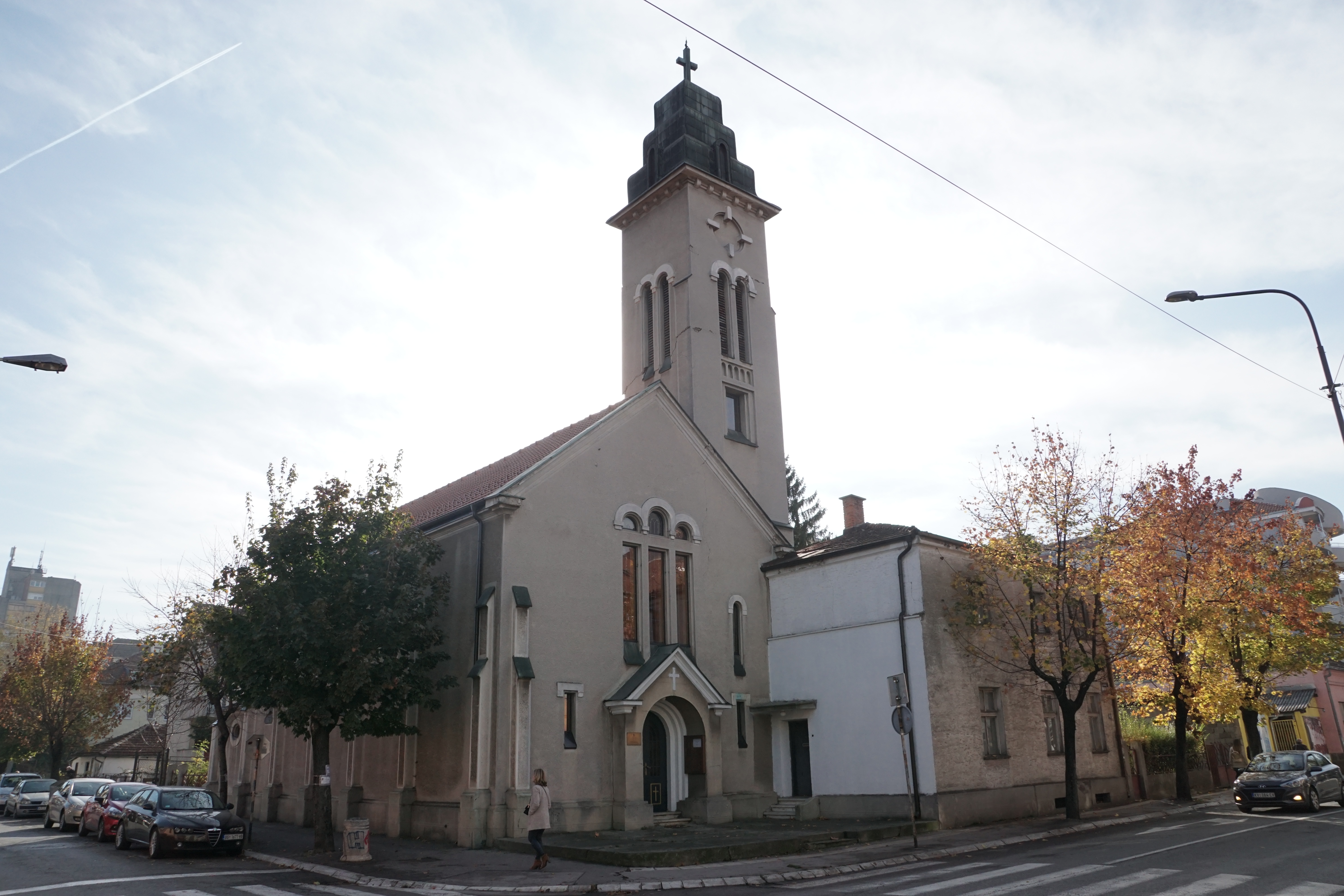
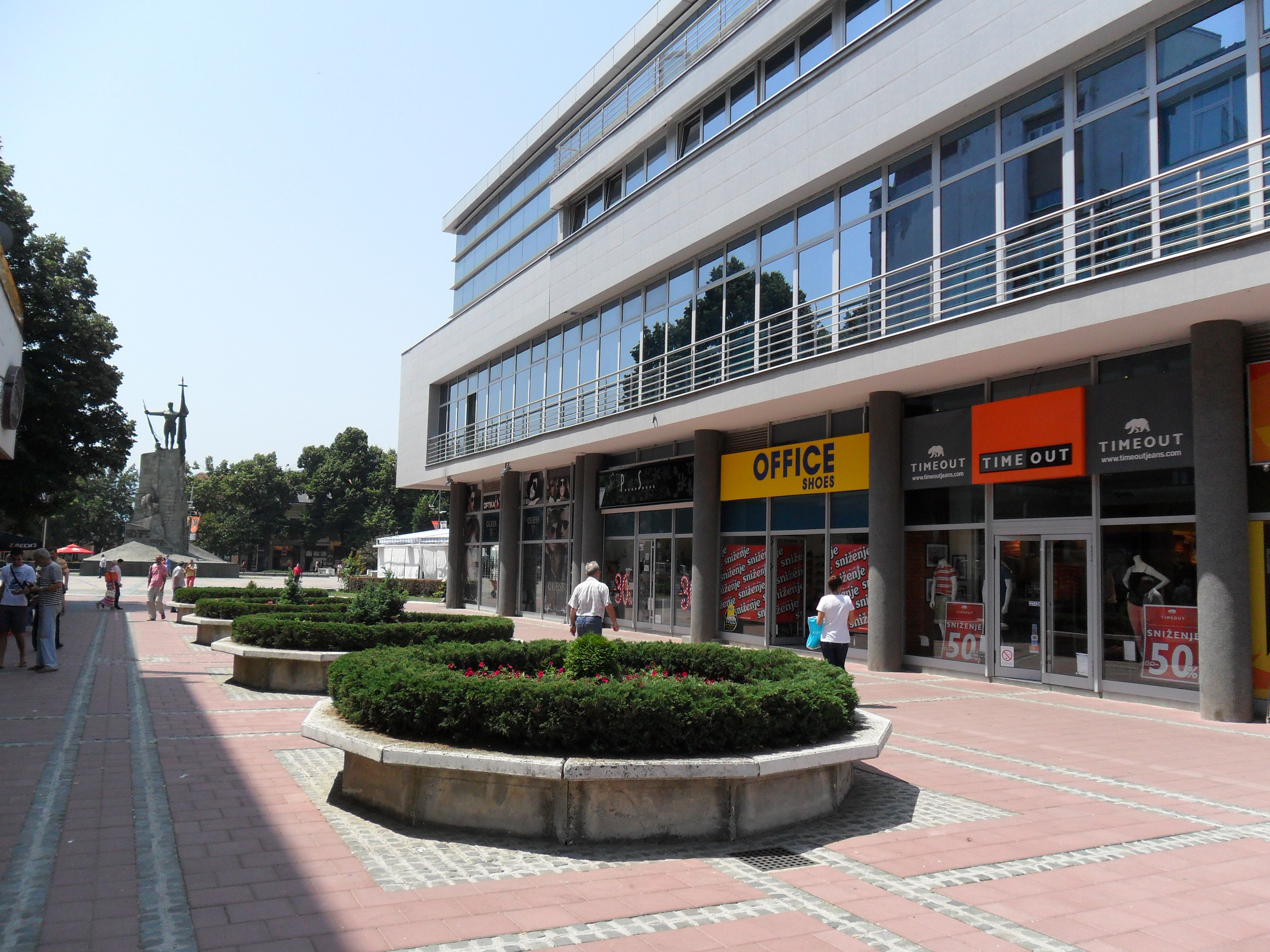
- Vojvode Stepe Street in Kraljevo National Museum of Kraljevo Archive in Kraljevo Holy Trinity Cathedral Monument to Serbian Soldier Žiča Monastery Maglič Fortress Church of Archangel Michael Hotel "Turist"

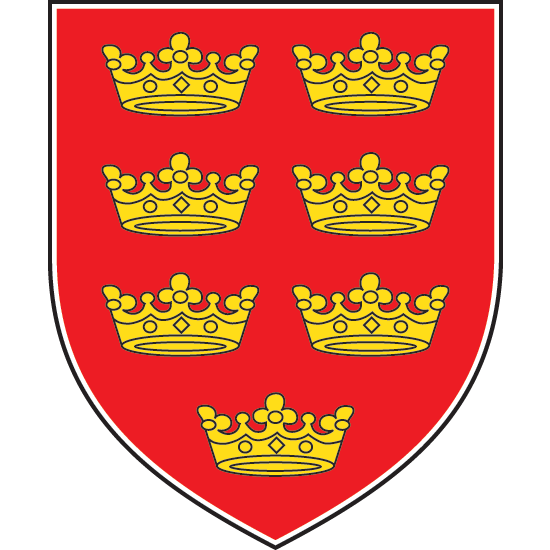
- Flag Coat of arms

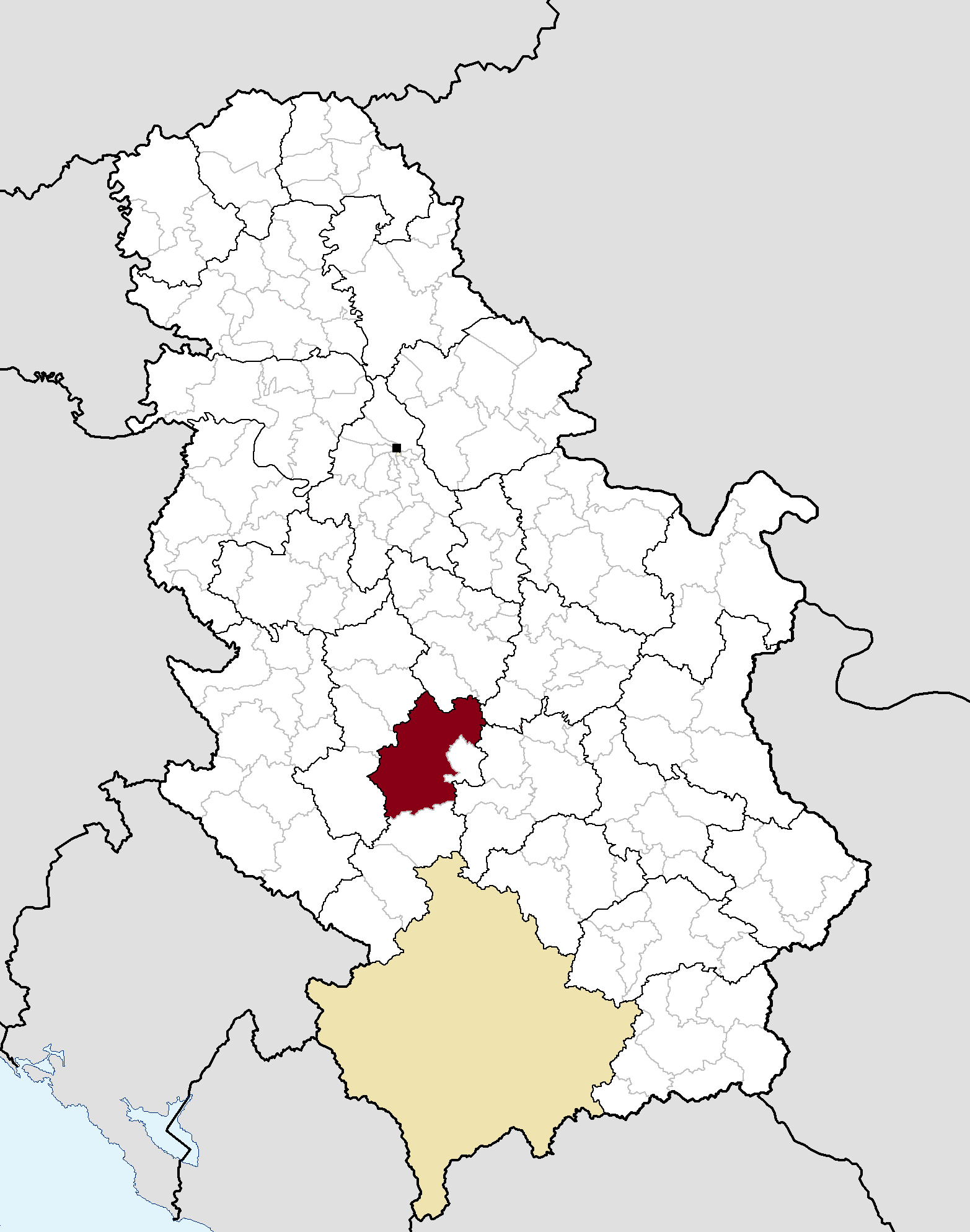
- Location of the city of Kraljevo within Serbia
- Coordinates: 43°43′25″N 20°41′15″E
- Country: Serbia
- Region: Šumadija and Western Serbia
- District: Raška
- Settlements: 92

Government
  - Mayor: Predrag Terzić (SNS)

Area
  - Rank: 2nd in Serbia
  - Urban: 24.43 km^{2} (9.43 sq mi)
  - Administrative: 1,529.55 km^{2} (590.56 sq mi)
- Elevation: 192 m (630 ft)

Population (2022 census)
  - Rank: 9th in Serbia
  - Urban: 57,432
  - Urban density: 2,351/km^{2} (6,089/sq mi)
  - Administrative: 110,196
  - Administrative density: 72.0447/km^{2} (186.595/sq mi)
- Time zone: UTC+1 (CET)
  - Summer (DST): UTC+2 (CEST)
- Postal code: 36000
- Area code: +381(0)36
- ISO 3166 code: SRB
- KV: Car plates
- Official languages: Serbian
- Website: www.kraljevo.rs

Kraljevo (Serbian Cyrillic: Краљево, pronounced [krǎːʎɛʋɔ]) is a city and the administrative center of the Raška District in central Serbia. It is situated on the confluence of West Morava and Ibar, in the geographical region of Šumadija, between the mountains of Kotlenik in the north, and Stolovi in the south.

In 2022, the city urban area has a population of 57,432 inhabitants, while the city administrative area has 110,196 inhabitants. With an area of 1530 km^{2}, it is the largest municipality (after Belgrade) in Serbia by area.

== Name ==
Formerly known as Rudo Polje (Рудо Поље), Karanovac (Карановац) and Rankovićevo (Ранковићево), Kraljevo received its present name, meaning "the King's Town", from King Milan I of Serbia in honor of his own coronation and six Serbian kings that had been crowned in that area. The modern coat of arms of the city features seven crowns symbolizing the seven kings.

== History and sights ==
The "lower" Ibar region is thought to be the first area where Serbs began to develop cultural, political and economic life. Since the end of the 11th century, the center of Grand Principality of Serbia was in the region of Raška, with state capital in the ancient fortress of Ras, near modern Novi Pazar. There are numerous monasteries in the Kraljevo area, Studenica (1188), Gradac and Stara Pavlica. There is also a medieval fortress known as Maglič. Monastery of Žiča (1219) was the original seat of Serbian Archbishop was used for the crowning of Serbian kings.

The village of Rudo Polje, from which Kraljevo arose, was settled during the 14th century. This area was occupied by the Turks between 1458 and 1459.

During the Turkish rule Rudo Polje became known as Karanovac. Karanovac became an important settlement during the war between Austria and Turkey in the period between 1718 and 1739. After 1718, a border between Austria and Turkey was established along right bank of river Morava. During the first uprising of the Serbs in 1805, Karanovac was heavily damaged and most of the Muslim population left, leaving the Serbs to continue development of the city during the period following the uprising.

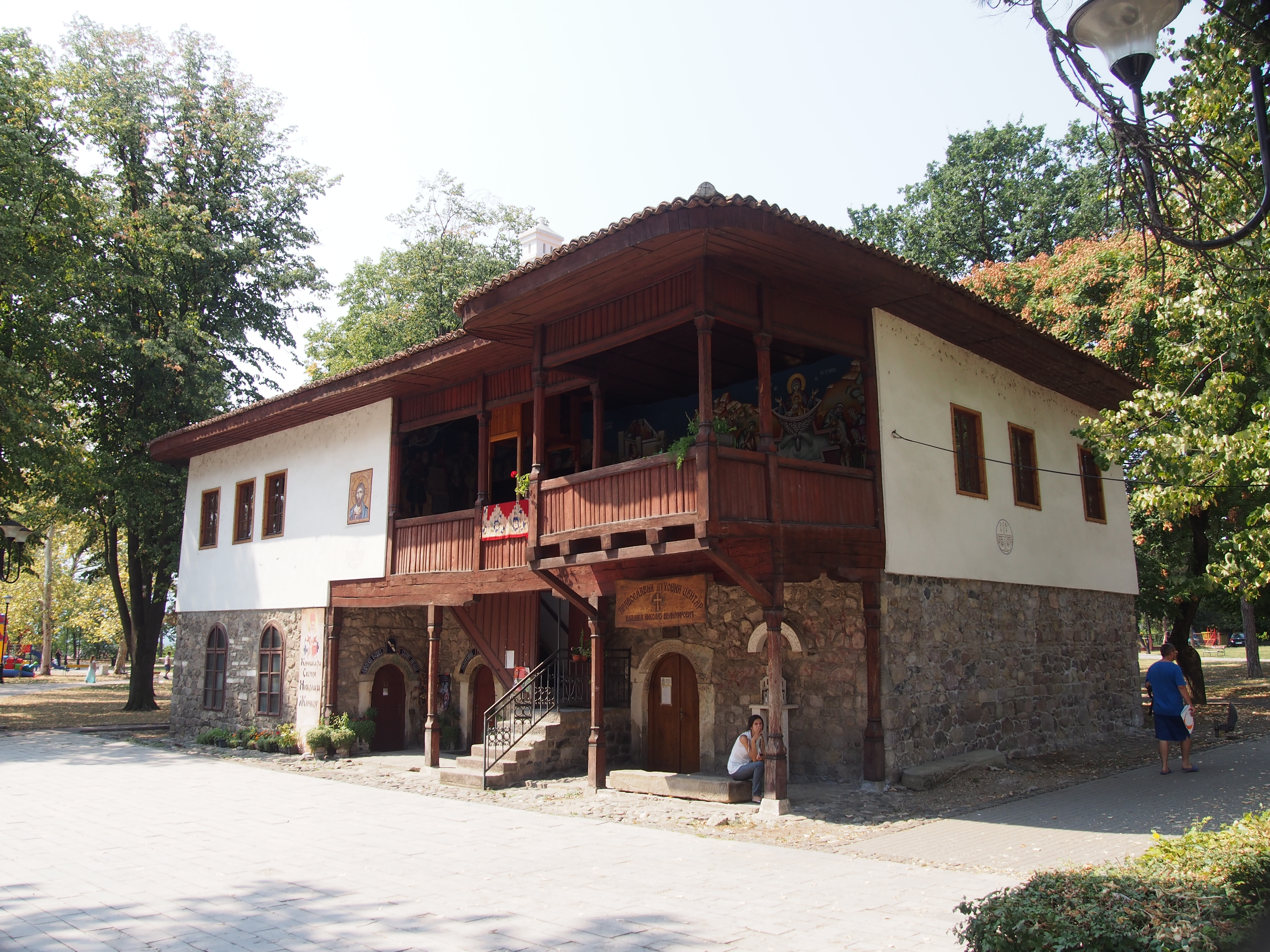
Gospodar Vasin konak (Master Vasa's mansion), built in 1830, the oldest preserved building

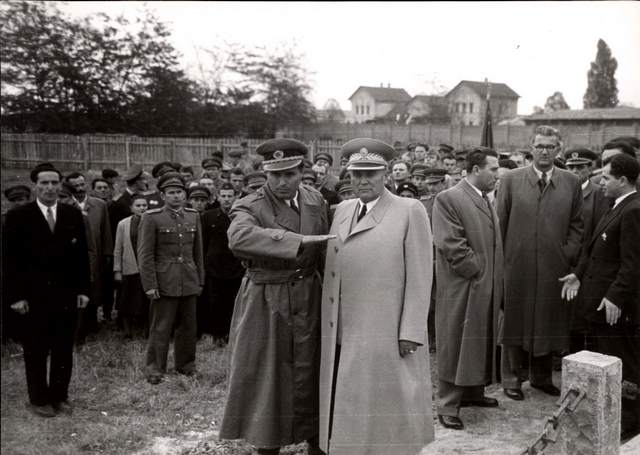
Josip Broz Tito in Kraljevo in 1951.

After the Second Serbian uprising, Karanovac was liberated in 1819 under the rule of Prince Miloš Obrenović. In that period the Orthodox Cathedral of the Holy Trinity was built; Gospodar Vasin konak, a mansion used by wealthy guests, as well as a number of significant public buildings. Kraljevo received the first urban plan and became an important economic city.

In 1882, King Milan Obrenović, establishing the Kingdom of Serbia, in honor of his coronation, changed Karanovac name to Kraljevo, and gave the order for restoration of rather dilapidated monastery Žiča.

In 1919, Nikolaj Velimirović, was consecrated Bishop of Žiča and spent a brief period in the city. He returned again in 1935 and stayed until 1941. He rebuilt and enlarged the monastery.

During World War II, Kraljevo was occupied by the German army. In October 1941, joint forces of Chetniks and Partisans besieged and attacked German forces in Kraljevo during the Siege of Kraljevo. In retaliation the Wehrmacht carried out the Kraljevo massacre, killing 2,000 residents of the city. A memorial complex constructed in the 1970s today commemorates the site of the massacre. In November 1944, heavy battles were fought in Kraljevo and its surrounding areas culminating in the city's liberation on 29 November 1944.

During the NATO bombing of Yugoslavia in 1999, the Lađevci Airport located near Kraljevo was bombed.

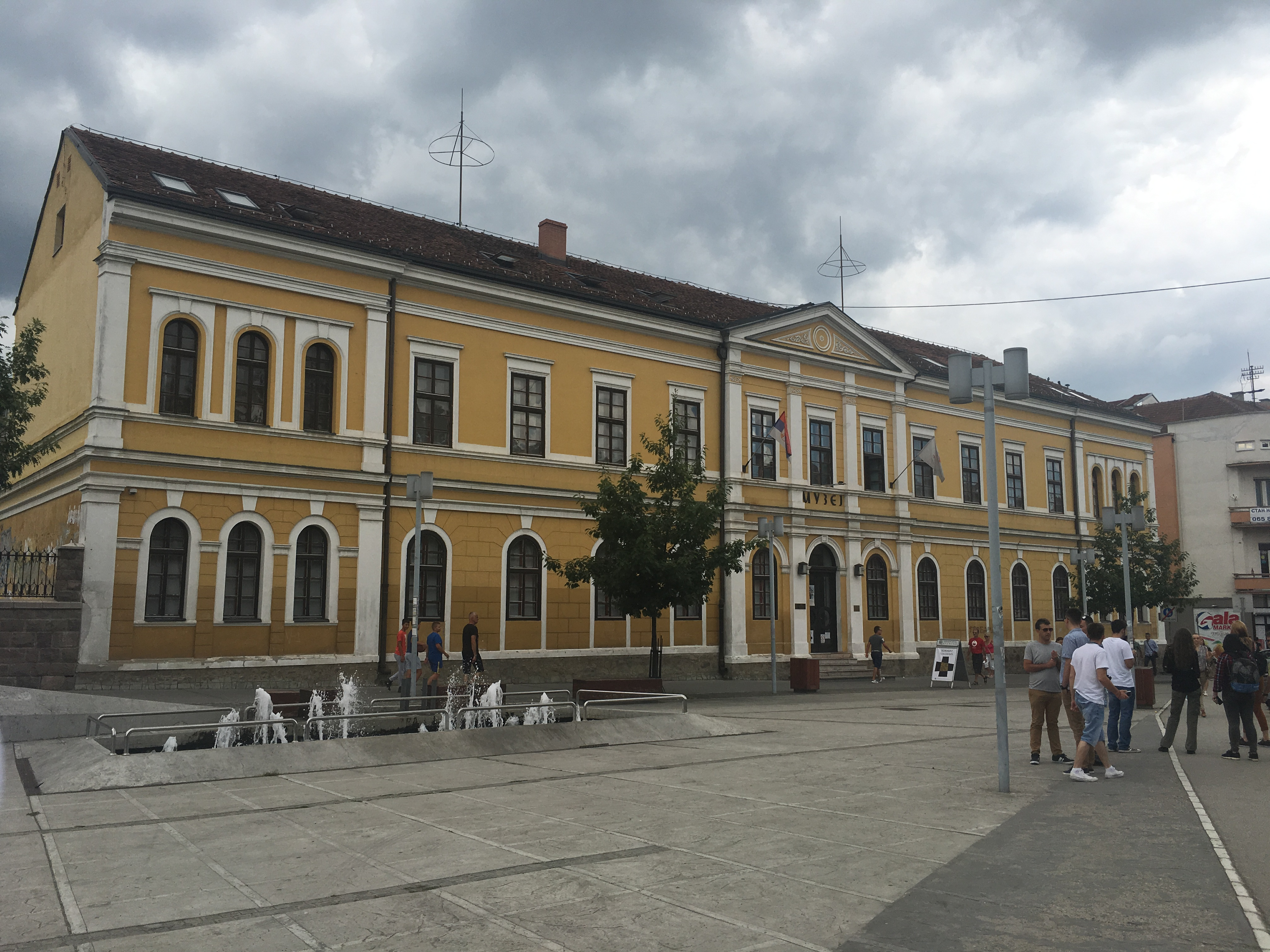
Kraljevo City Museum

One prominent feature of the area is the Coronation church which belongs to the Žiča monastery. Seven Serbian kings are said to have been crowned (the seven crowns on the city coat of arms represent this assumption) in the church. The church is Byzantine in style, and has been partially restored, with only the main tower remaining from the original building dating to 1210, when it was founded by Saint Sava, the patron saint of Serbia.

The famous monastery of Studenica, 39 km (24 mi) south west of Kraljevo, stands high among the south-western mountains, overlooking the Studenica, a tributary of the Ibar. It consists of a group of old-fashioned timber and plaster buildings, a tall belfry, and a diminutive church of white marble, founded in 1190 by King Stefan Nemanja, who became a monk and was canonized as Saint Simeon. The carvings around the north, south and west doors have been partially defaced by the Turks. The inner walls are decorated with Byzantine frescoes, among which only a painting of the Last Supper, and the portraits of five saints remain from the original artwork. The dome and narthex are relatively modern additions.

The silver shrine of Saint Simeon sits within the church, along with many gold and silver ornaments, church vessels and old manuscripts, and a set of vestments and a reliquary, believed by the monks to have been the property of Saint Sava who founded the first hospital in Studenica in the 13th century.

In various historical periods, Kraljevo was part of various administrative formats within Serbia, for example in the Kingdom of Serbs, Croats and Slovenes, as part of Northern Serbia, during the time of Kingdom of Yugoslavia as part of the Moravian Banovina, etc., and today it is officially part of Sumadija & Western Serbia Region.

=== 2010 earthquake ===
Kraljevo was shaken by a M_{w} 5.4 earthquake on 3 November 2010. Two people died and over 100 suffered light injuries. A number of buildings suffered damage, and several hundreds, chiefly older buildings, were rendered unusable. There were several weaker aftershocks including a 4.3 M_{w} earthquake on November 4.

== Demographics ==
Historical population
| Year | Pop. | ±% |
|---|---|---|
| 1948 | 12,735 | — |
| 1953 | 16,968 | +33.2% |
| 1961 | 24,195 | +42.6% |
| 1971 | 36,484 | +50.8% |
| 1981 | 53,318 | +46.1% |
| 1991 | 58,361 | +9.5% |
| 2002 | 58,847 | +0.8% |
| 2011 | 64,175 | +9.1% |
| 2022 | 57,432 | −10.5% |

According to the 2022 census, a total of 57,432 people live in the city proper, while 110,196 live in the administrative area.

The city of Kraljevo has 41,358 households with 3,03 members on average, while the number of homes is 53,367.

The religious makeup of the city of Kraljevo is predominantly Serbian Orthodox (120,240), with minorities of Muslims (932), Atheists (487), Catholics (286), Protestants (82) and others.

Most of the population speaks Serbian.

The composition of population by sex and average age:

- Male - 61,585 (41.02 years) and
- Female - 63,903 (43.45 years).

A total of 53,137 citizens (older than 15 years) have secondary education (49.78%), while the 15,281 citizens have higher education (14.31%). Of those with higher education, 9,326 (8.73%) have university education.

=== Ethnic groups ===
The ethnic composition in the city of Kraljevo, according to the 2011 census:

| Ethnic group | Population 2011 | % |
|---|---|---|
| Serbs | 120,267 | 95.84% |
| Romani | 1,266 | 1.01% |
| Macedonians | 224 | 0.18% |
| Croats | 162 | 0.13% |
| Yugoslavs | 106 | 0.08% |
| Muslims | 44 | 0.04% |
| Russians | 40 | 0.03% |
| Bulgarians | 33 | 0.03% |
| Hungarians | 30 | 0.02% |
| Slovenes | 29 | 0.02% |
| Others | 3,287 | 2.62% |
| Total | 125,488 | |

== Settlements ==
At 1,530 square kilometres (591 sq mi) Kraljevo is the largest municipality of Serbia by area. Apart from the urban area, the city administrative area includes 92 settlements:

- Adrani
- Banjevac
- Bapsko Polje
- Bare
- Bogutovac
- Bojanići
- Borovo
- Bresnik
- Brezna
- Brezova
- Bukovica
- Bzovik
- Cerje
- Čibukovac
- Čukojevac
- Cvetke
- Đakovo
- Dedevci
- Dolac (Kraljevo)
- Dragosinjci
- Drakčići
- Dražiniće
- Drlupa
- Gledić
- Godačica
- Gokčanica
- Grdica
- Jarčujak
- Kamenica
- Kamenjani
- Konarevo
- Kovači
- Kovanluk
- Lađevci
- Lazac
- Leševo
- Lopatnica
- Lozno
- Maglič
- Mataruge
- Mataruška Banja
- Međurečje
- Meljanica
- Metikoš
- Milakovac
- Milavčići
- Miliće
- Miločaj
- Mlanča
- Mrsać
- Musina Reka
- Obrva
- Oplanići
- Orlja Glava
- Pečenog
- Pekčanica
- Petropolje
- Plana
- Polumir
- Popovići
- Predole
- Progorelica
- Ratina
- Ravanica
- Reka
- Ribnica
- Roćevići
- Rudnjak
- Rudno
- Samaila
- Savovo
- Sibnica
- Sirča
- Stanča
- Stubal
- Šumarice
- Tadenje
- Tavnik
- Tepeče
- Tolišnica
- Trgovište
- Ušće
- Vitanovac
- Vitkovac
- Vrba
- Vrdila
- Vrh
- Zaklopača
- Zakuta
- Zamčanje
- Zasad
- Žiča

Of those, Adrani, Centar, Čibukovac, Grdica, Higijenski Zavod, Jarčujak, Konarevo, Mataruge, Mataruška Banja, Metikoš, Ratina, Ribnica, Stara Čaršija, Vitanovac, Vrba, Zaklopača, Zelena gora and Žiča lie within the proper city limits.

== Economy ==
The following table gives a preview of total number of registered people employed in legal entities per their core activity (as of 2022):

| Activity | Total |
|---|---|
| Agriculture, forestry and fishing | 371 |
| Mining and quarrying | 156 |
| Manufacturing | 11,532 |
| Electricity, gas, steam and air conditioning supply | 482 |
| Water supply; sewerage, waste management and remediation activities | 520 |
| Construction | 1,843 |
| Wholesale and retail trade, repair of motor vehicles and motorcycles | 4,913 |
| Transportation and storage | 1,976 |
| Accommodation and food services | 1,356 |
| Information and communication | 678 |
| Financial and insurance activities | 371 |
| Real estate activities | 123 |
| Professional, scientific and technical activities | 1,235 |
| Administrative and support service activities | 561 |
| Public administration and defense; compulsory social security | 2,338 |
| Education | 2,360 |
| Human health and social work activities | 2,529 |
| Arts, entertainment and recreation | 493 |
| Other service activities | 646 |
| Individual agricultural workers | 817 |
| Total | 35,298 |

== Tourism ==
Since 1990 an annual regatta called "Joyful descend" (Veseli spust) is held on the Ibar river. The course is 25 km (16 mi) long, starts at the Maglič fortress and ends in Kraljevo. It is held in the early July and in 2017 it was attended by over 300 boats and 5,000 people. Inaugural regatta in 1990 had 150 participants, but the number grew to 10,000 in 2004–06 and 20,000 in 2008.

== Sport ==
Basketball, volleyball, and football are the most popular sports in Kraljevo. The local volleyball team, OK Ribnica, competes in the top-tier Volleyball League of Serbia. The basketball club KK Sloga plays in the first-tier Basketball League of Serbia. In football, FK Kablar Sijaće Polje competes in the regional league of Serbia, while FK Sloga, biggest football club in Kraljevo was shut down due to financial issues.

== Climate ==
Climate data for Kraljevo (1991–2020, extremes 1961–present)
| Month | Jan | Feb | Mar | Apr | May | Jun | Jul | Aug | Sep | Oct | Nov | Dec | Year |
|---|---|---|---|---|---|---|---|---|---|---|---|---|---|
| Record high °C (°F) | 20.1 (68.2) | 25.5 (77.9) | 30.3 (86.5) | 32.1 (89.8) | 35.0 (95.0) | 39.2 (102.6) | 43.6 (110.5) | 41.0 (105.8) | 37.3 (99.1) | 33.8 (92.8) | 28.6 (83.5) | 22.0 (71.6) | 43.6 (110.5) |
| Mean daily maximum °C (°F) | 4.7 (40.5) | 7.9 (46.2) | 13.0 (55.4) | 18.3 (64.9) | 22.8 (73.0) | 26.6 (79.9) | 29.0 (84.2) | 29.4 (84.9) | 24.0 (75.2) | 18.4 (65.1) | 12.0 (53.6) | 5.7 (42.3) | 17.7 (63.9) |
| Daily mean °C (°F) | 0.6 (33.1) | 2.9 (37.2) | 7.2 (45.0) | 12.2 (54.0) | 16.6 (61.9) | 20.5 (68.9) | 22.4 (72.3) | 22.3 (72.1) | 17.3 (63.1) | 12.1 (53.8) | 7.0 (44.6) | 1.8 (35.2) | 11.9 (53.4) |
| Mean daily minimum °C (°F) | −2.9 (26.8) | −1.4 (29.5) | 2.1 (35.8) | 6.2 (43.2) | 10.5 (50.9) | 14.3 (57.7) | 15.7 (60.3) | 15.6 (60.1) | 11.6 (52.9) | 7.1 (44.8) | 2.9 (37.2) | −1.4 (29.5) | 6.7 (44.1) |
| Record low °C (°F) | −24.0 (−11.2) | −23.6 (−10.5) | −15.7 (3.7) | −6.3 (20.7) | −1.6 (29.1) | 2.9 (37.2) | 7.0 (44.6) | 3.1 (37.6) | −1.8 (28.8) | −5.6 (21.9) | −17.4 (0.7) | −19.2 (−2.6) | −24.0 (−11.2) |
| Average precipitation mm (inches) | 44.8 (1.76) | 47.0 (1.85) | 61.0 (2.40) | 63.6 (2.50) | 83.7 (3.30) | 91.7 (3.61) | 73.6 (2.90) | 61.0 (2.40) | 60.4 (2.38) | 62.9 (2.48) | 49.0 (1.93) | 53.4 (2.10) | 752.1 (29.61) |
| Average precipitation days (≥ 0.1 mm) | 13.2 | 13.1 | 12.7 | 12.6 | 14.7 | 11.9 | 10.4 | 8.4 | 10.6 | 10.7 | 10.4 | 13.9 | 142.6 |
| Average snowy days | 9.0 | 7.8 | 4.8 | 0.9 | 0.0 | 0.0 | 0.0 | 0.0 | 0.0 | 0.2 | 2.9 | 7.7 | 33.3 |
| Average relative humidity (%) | 81.8 | 75.4 | 68.5 | 66.6 | 69.9 | 69.0 | 66.1 | 66.2 | 72.0 | 77.4 | 79.0 | 83.0 | 72.9 |
| Mean monthly sunshine hours | 64.4 | 89.8 | 141.8 | 171.1 | 212.3 | 247.1 | 279.6 | 272.4 | 185.0 | 139.6 | 85.2 | 51.4 | 1,939.7 |
Source: Republic Hydrometeorological Service of Serbia

== Famous residents ==
- Zoran Bojanić (born 1959), Serbian politician and deputy of the National Assembly of Serbia
- Sevastijan Dabović (1863–1940), Serbian-American Orthodox monk, missionary and saint
- Vlade Divac (born 1968), Serbian basketball executive and former player in the NBA
- Nebojša Dugalić (born 1970), Serbian actor and theater director
- Marko Gobeljić (born 1992), Serbian footballer
- Stefan Jovanović (born 1994), Serbian footballer
- Danilo Kalafatović (1875–1946), Yugoslav army general
- Nikola Kovačević (born 1983) Serbian volleyball player
- Nenad Krstić (born 1983), Serbian basketball executive and former player in the NBA
- Jovan Kursula (1768–1813), Serbian vojvoda
- Aleksandar Luković (born 1982), Serbian football manager and former player
- Petar Luković (1951–2024), Serbian journalist and newspaper editor
- Vasilije Micić (born 1994), Serbian NBA and Israeli Basketball Premier League basketball player and 2021 Euroleague MVP
- Marko Nikolić, Serbian actor
- Predrag Živković Tozovac (1936–2021), Serbian folk singer and composer
- Mira Trailović (1924–1989), Serbian dramaturg and theater director

== Twin towns – sister cities ==
Kraljevo is twinned with:

- Gjorče Petrov (Skopje), North Macedonia
- Grodno, Belarus
- Ivanovo, Russia
- Lod, Israel
- Maribor, Slovenia
- Niagara Falls, Canada
- Plužine, Montenegro
- Uvarovo, Russia
- Zielona Góra, Poland
- North Mitrovica, Kosovo

== Gallery ==
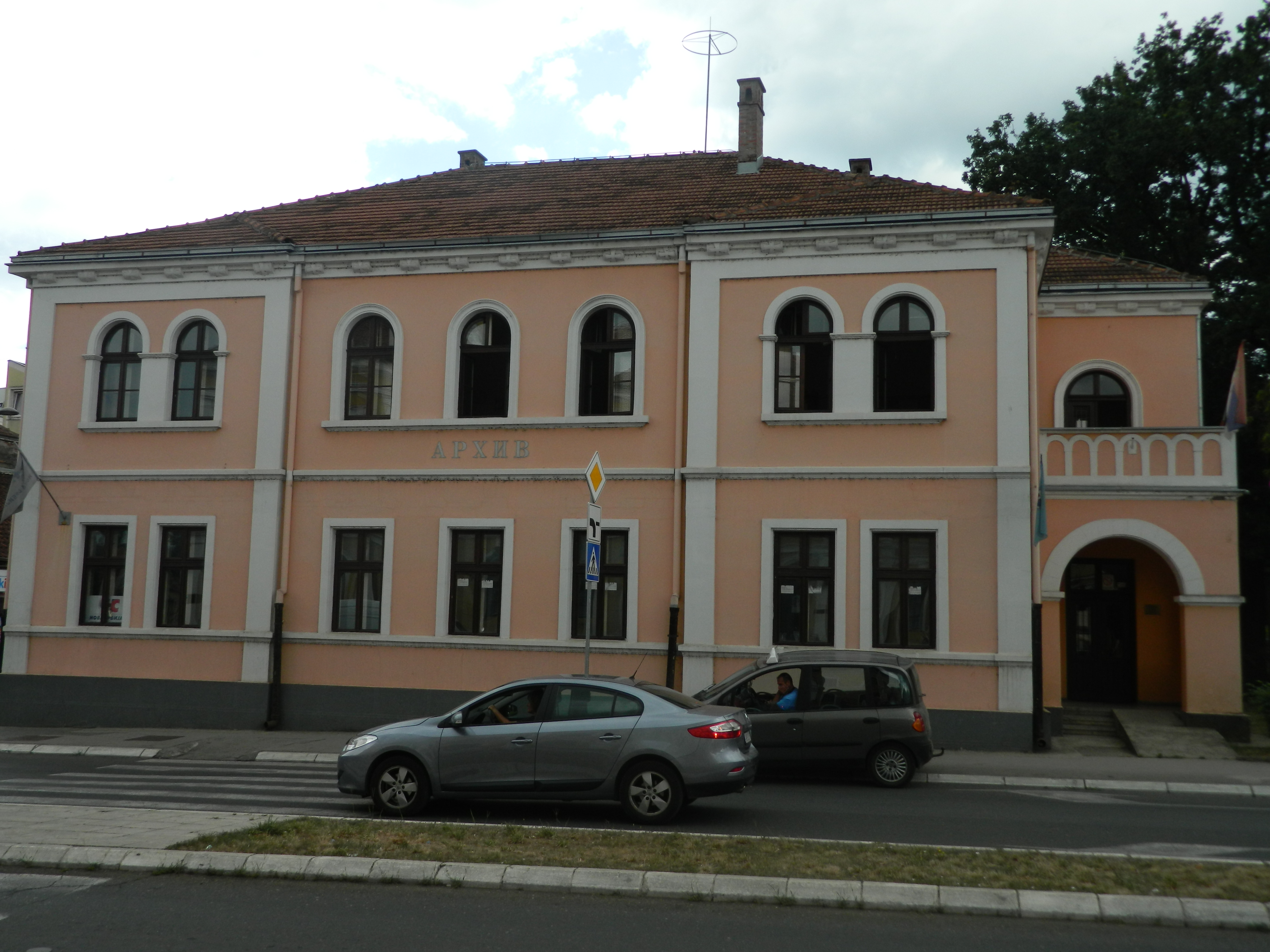
Archive in Kraljevo

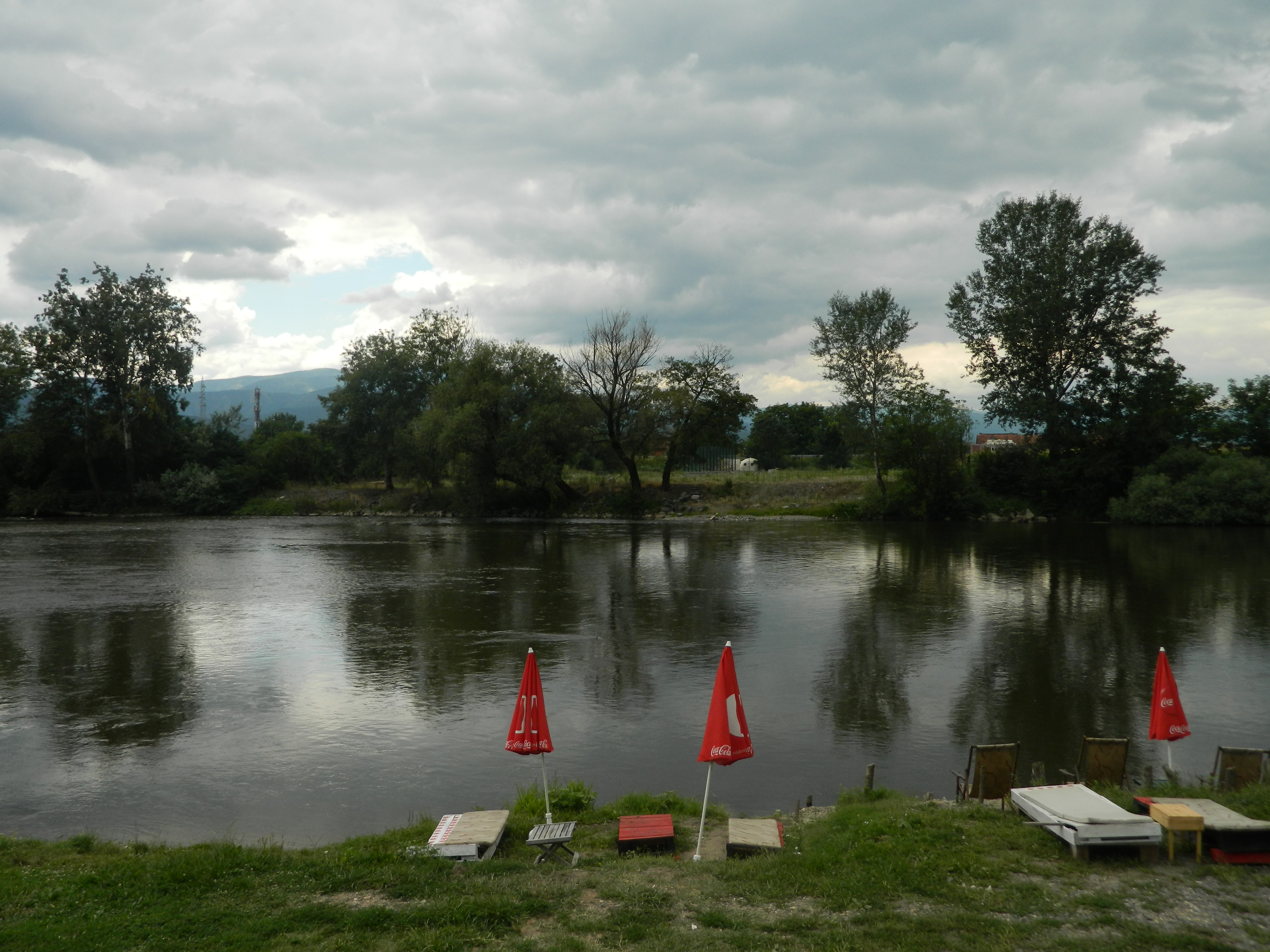
Ibar River, Kraljevo

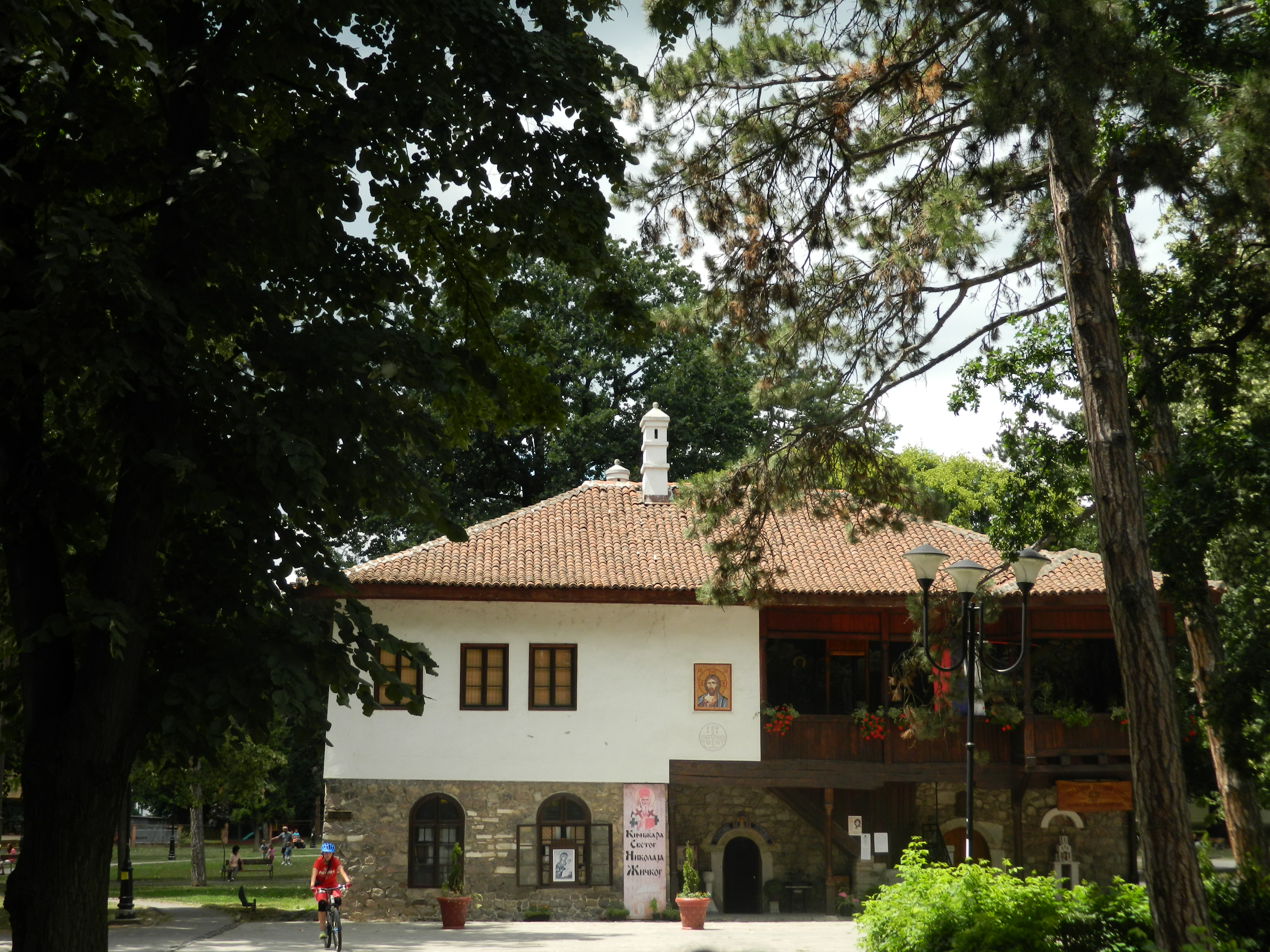
Park, Kraljevo

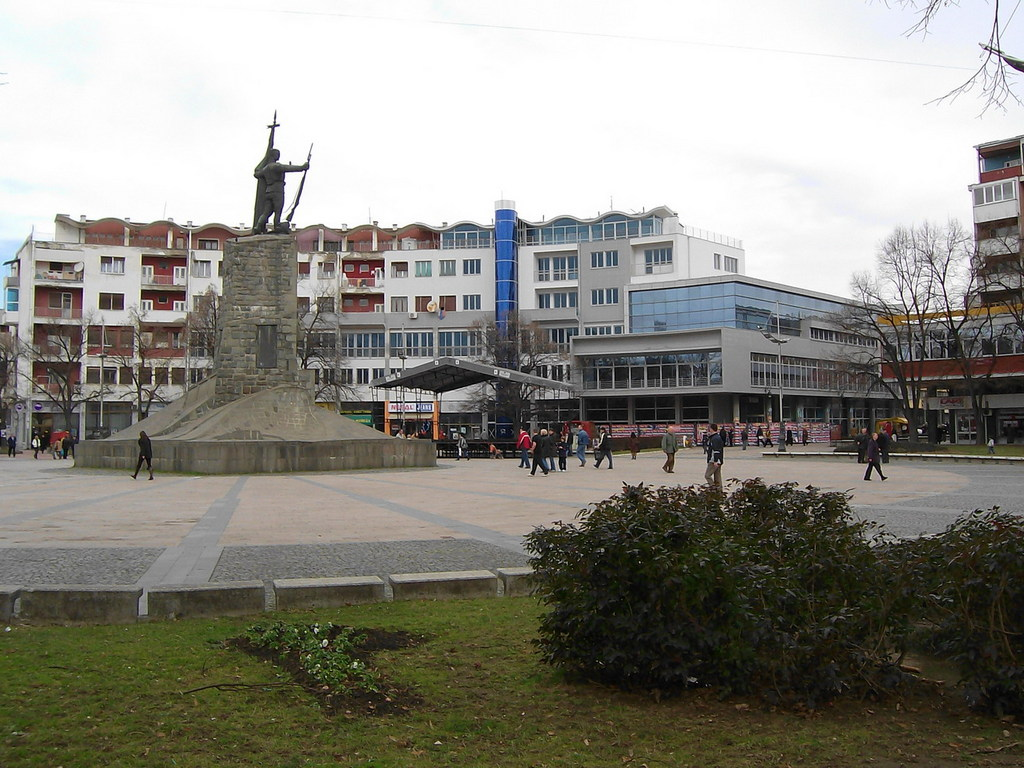
City center square

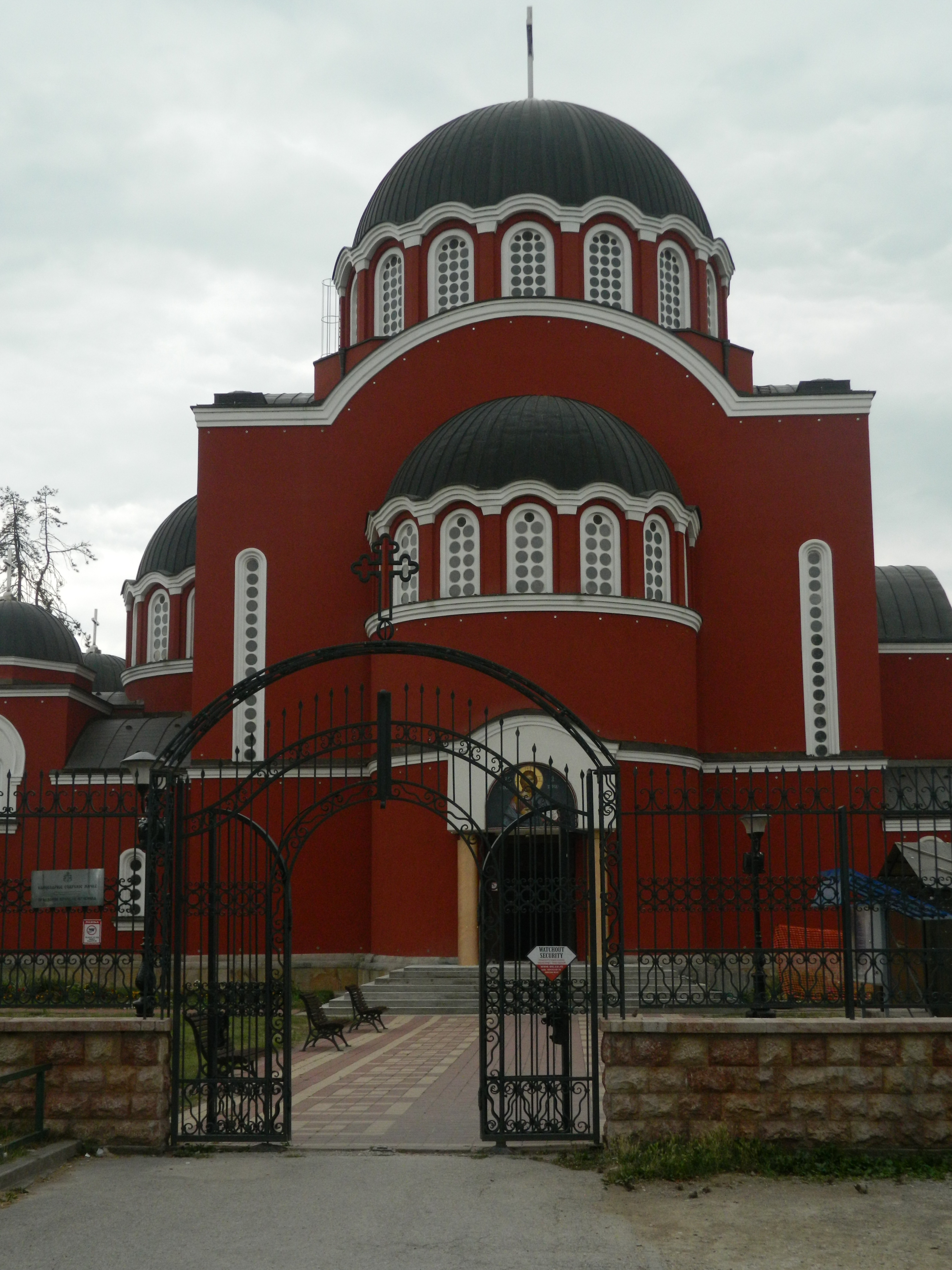
Church of Saint Sava, Kraljevo

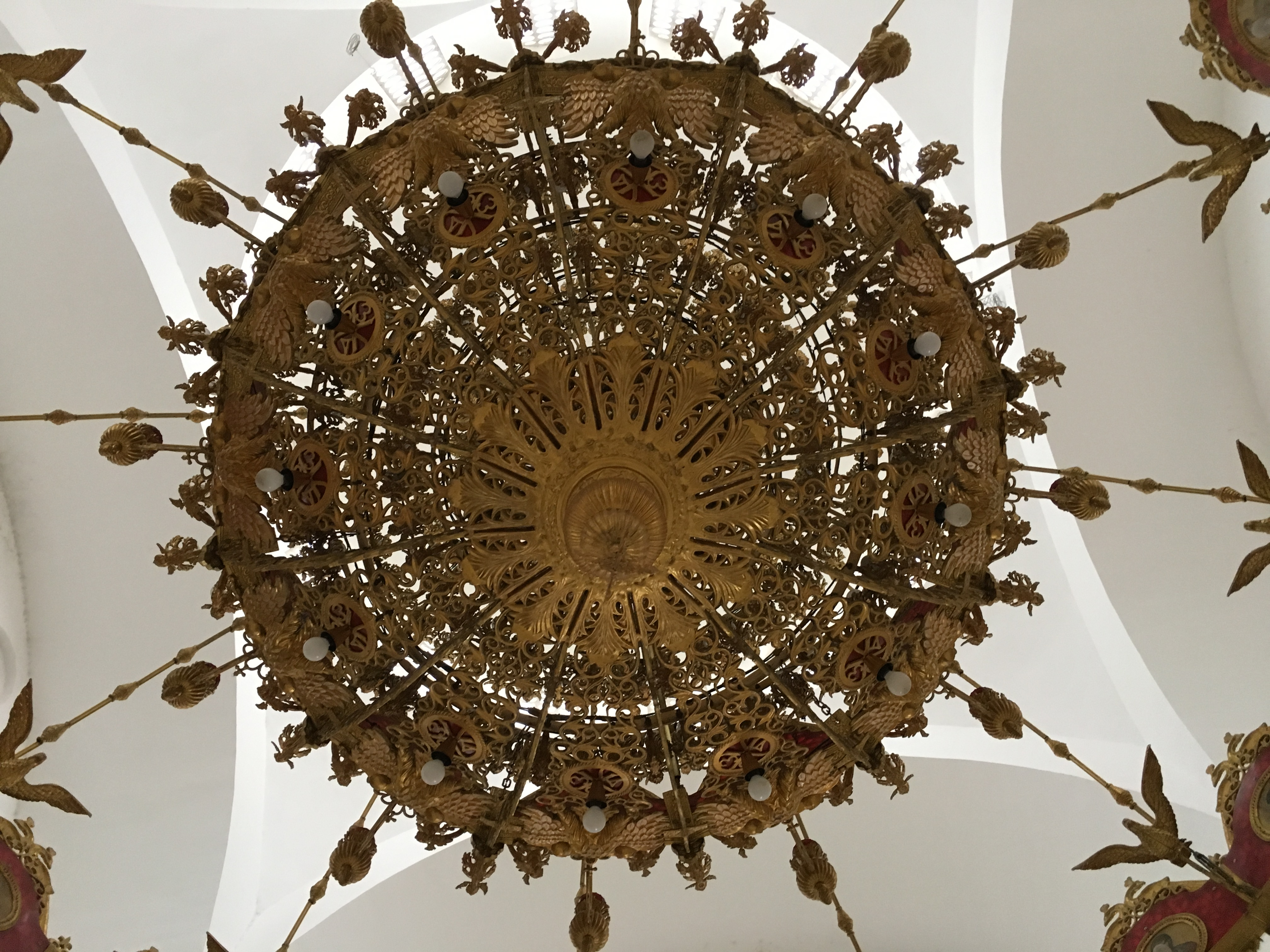
Inside the Cathedral of Saint Sava, Kraljevo

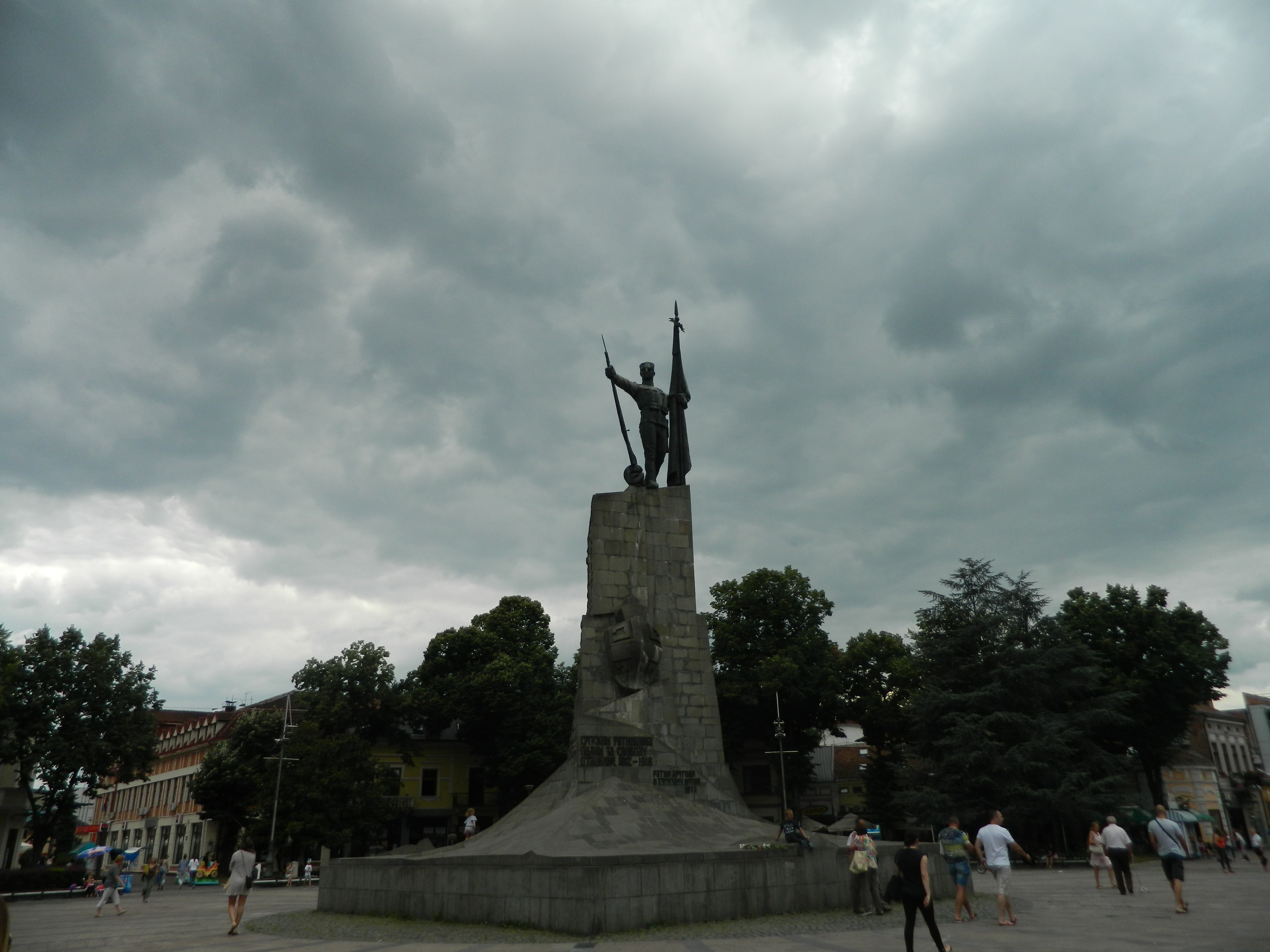
Monument to the Serbian Soldier, Kraljevo

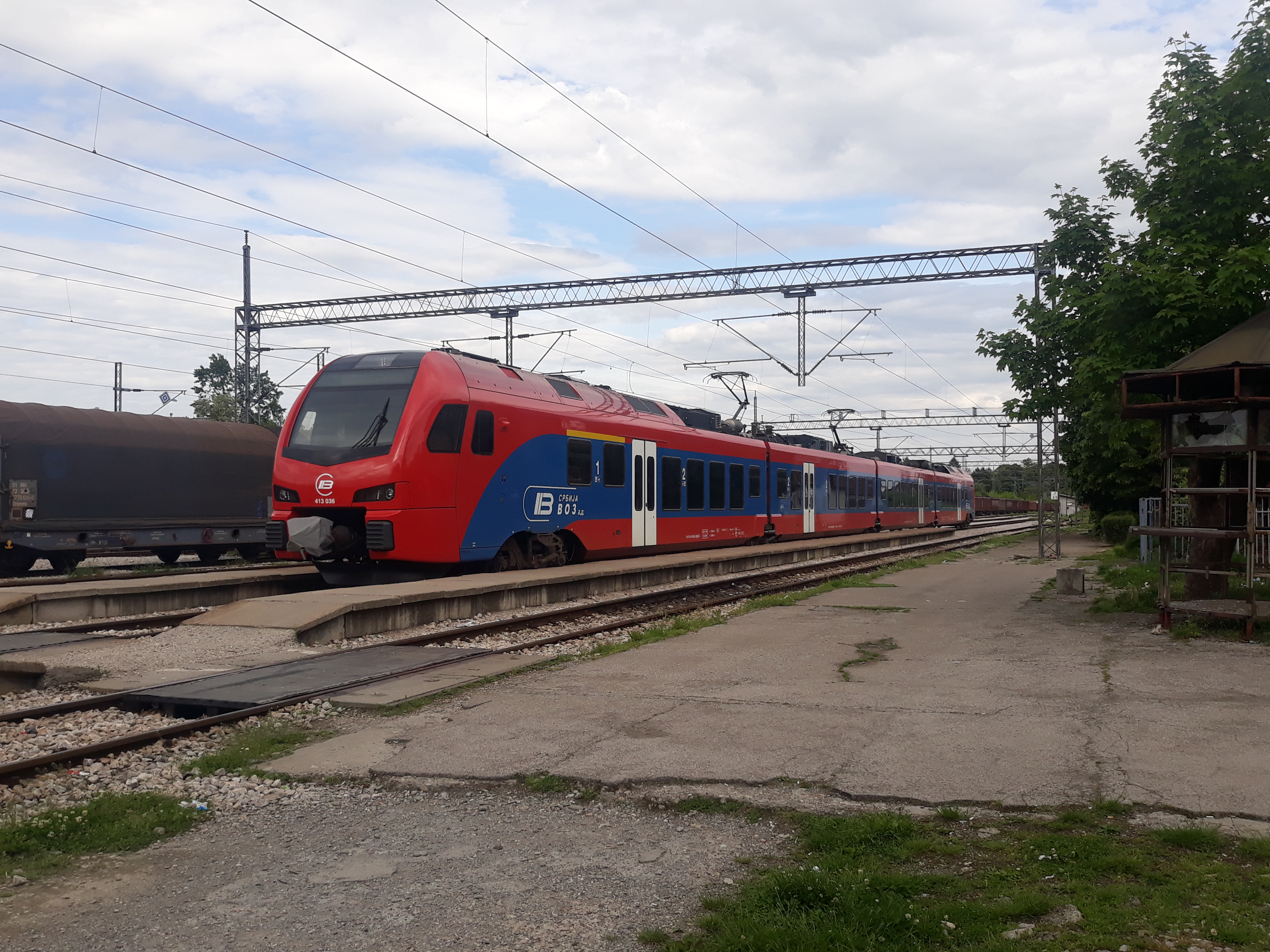
Kraljevo Train Station

== See also ==
- Morava Airport
- Pridvorica (Kraljevo)
- Raška District
- Šumadija and Western Serbia
- List of places in Serbia
