= Stanča (Kraljevo) =

Coordinates: 43°41′N 20°28′E

Stanča Станча (Serbian)
- Village (Selo)
- Interactive map of Stanča
- Country: Serbia
- Municipality: Kraljevo
- Time zone: UTC+1 (CET)
  - Summer (DST): UTC+2 (CEST)

Stanča is a village situated in Kraljevo municipality in Serbia.
