= Čibukovac =

Čibukovac Чибуковац (Serbian)
- suburban settlement
- Location within Serbia
- Coordinates: 43°43′N 20°37′E
- Country: Serbia
- District: Raška District
- Municipality: Kraljevo

Population (2002)
  - Total: 1,114
- Time zone: UTC+1 (CET)
  - Summer (DST): UTC+2 (CEST)

Čibukovac is a suburban settlement in the municipality of Kraljevo, western-central Serbia. According to the 2002 census, the village has a population of 1114 people.
