= Lopatnica =

Coordinates: 43°38′N 20°34′E

Lopatnica Лопатница (Serbian)
- Village (Selo)
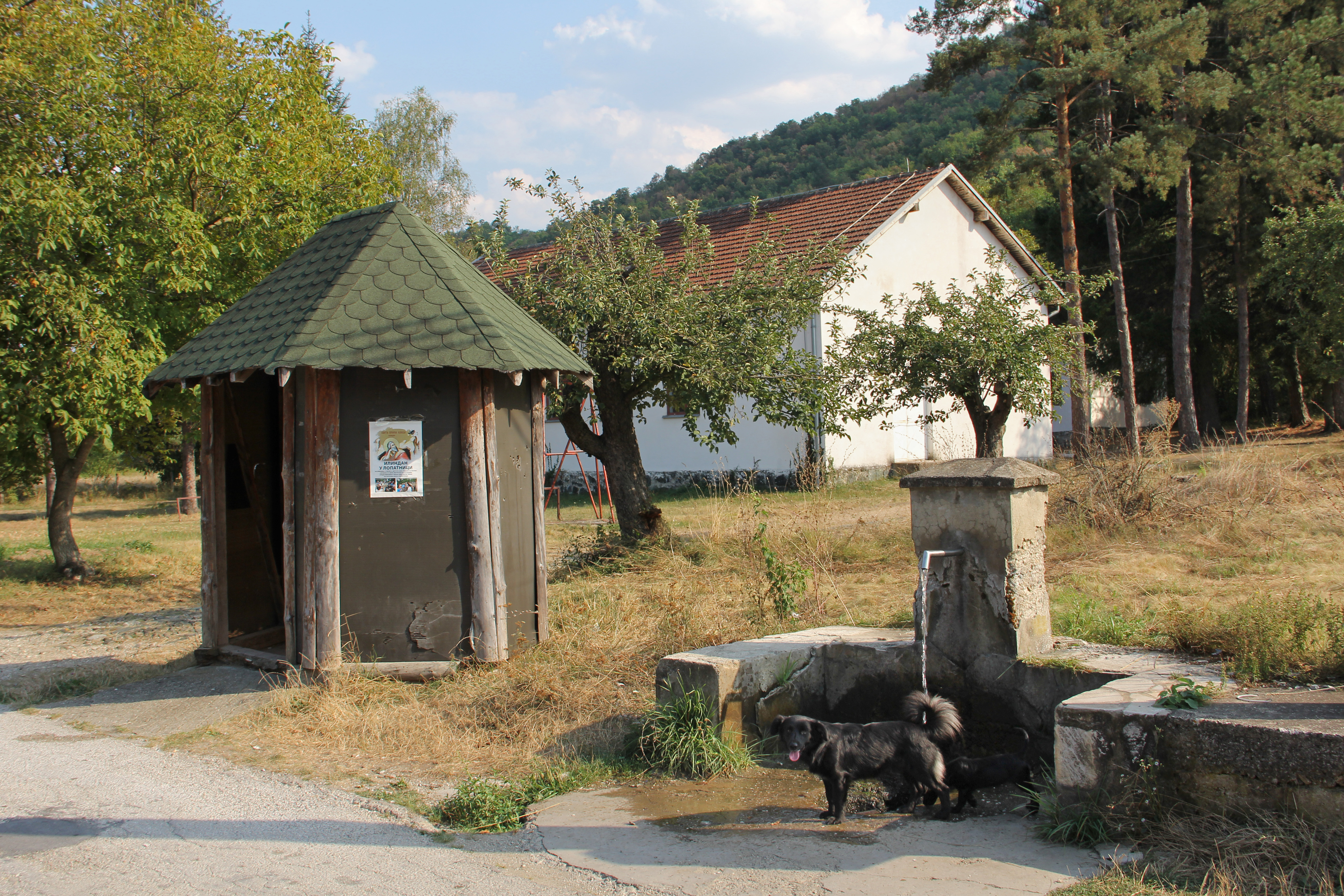
- Interactive map of Lopatnica
- Country: Serbia
- Municipality: Kraljevo
- Time zone: UTC+1 (CET)
  - Summer (DST): UTC+2 (CEST)

Lopatnica is a village situated in Kraljevo municipality in Serbia.
