= Grdica =

Coordinates: 43°44′41″N 20°40′25″E

Grdica Грдица (Serbian)
- suburb
- Interactive map of Grdica
- Country: Serbia
- Municipality: Kraljevo
- Time zone: UTC+1 (CET)
  - Summer (DST): UTC+2 (CEST)

Grdica is a suburb situated in Kraljevo municipality in Serbia.
