= Rudnjak =

Coordinates: 43.5000°N 20.7000°E

Rudnjak Рудњак (Serbian)
- Village (Selo)
- Interactive map of Rudnjak
- Country: Serbia
- District: Raška District
- Municipality: Kraljevo
- Time zone: UTC+1 (CET)
  - Summer (DST): UTC+2 (CEST)

Rudnjak is a village situated in Kraljevo municipality in Serbia.
