= Pekčanica =

Pekčanica Пекчаница (Serbian)
- Village (Selo)
- Location within Serbia
- Coordinates: 43°42′N 20°28′E
- Country: Serbia
- District: Raška District
- Municipality: Kraljevo

Area
  - Total: 10.42 km^{2} (4.02 sq mi)
- Elevation: 443 m (1,453 ft)

Population (2011)
  - Total: 219
  - Density: 21.0/km^{2} (54.4/sq mi)
- Time zone: UTC+1 (CET)
  - Summer (DST): UTC+2 (CEST)

Pekčanica (Serbian Cyrillic: Пекчаница) is a village situated in Kraljevo municipality in central Serbia. As of 2011 census, it has a population of 219 inhabitants.
