= Gokčanica =

Coordinates: 43°30′N 20°42′E

Gokčanica Гокчаница (Serbian)
- Village (Selo)
- Interactive map of Gokčanica
- Country: Serbia
- District: Raška
- Municipality: Kraljevo
- Time zone: UTC+1 (CET)
  - Summer (DST): UTC+2 (CEST)

Gokčanica is a village situated in Kraljevo municipality in Serbia.
