= Metikoš, Serbia =

Metikoš Метикош (Serbian)
- Village (Selo)
- Interactive map of Metikoš
- Coordinates: 43°40′N 20°43′E
- Country: Serbia
- District: Raška District
- Municipality: Kraljevo

Population (2022)
  - Total: 687
- Time zone: UTC+1 (CET)
  - Summer (DST): UTC+2 (CEST)

Metikoš is a village situated in Kraljevo municipality in Serbia.

According to the 2022 census, village had 687 inhabitants.

The settlement is largely inhabited by Serbs (according to the 2002 census ), in the last census a decrease in population was observed.

There were 538 adults living in Metikoš, average age of the population is 38.8 years (38.0 for men and 39.6 for women). There were 206 households in the settlement, and the average number of members per household is 3.34. (According to the 2011 census)
