= Međurečje (Kraljevo) =

Coordinates: 43°29′N 20°42′E

Međurečje Међуречје (Serbian)
- Village (Selo)
- Interactive map of Međurečje
- Country: Serbia
- Municipality: Kraljevo
- Time zone: UTC+1 (CET)
  - Summer (DST): UTC+2 (CEST)

Međurečje is a village situated in Kraljevo municipality in Serbia.
