= Leševo =

Coordinates: 43°43′N 20°53′E

Leševo Лешево (Serbian)
- Village (Selo)
- Interactive map of Leševo
- Country: Serbia
- District: Raška District
- Municipality: Kraljevo
- Time zone: UTC+1 (CET)
  - Summer (DST): UTC+2 (CEST)

Leševo is a village situated in Kraljevo municipality in Serbia.
