= Rudno (Kraljevo) =

Coordinates: 43°24′32″N 20°28′34″E

Rudno Рудно (Serbian)
- Village (Selo)
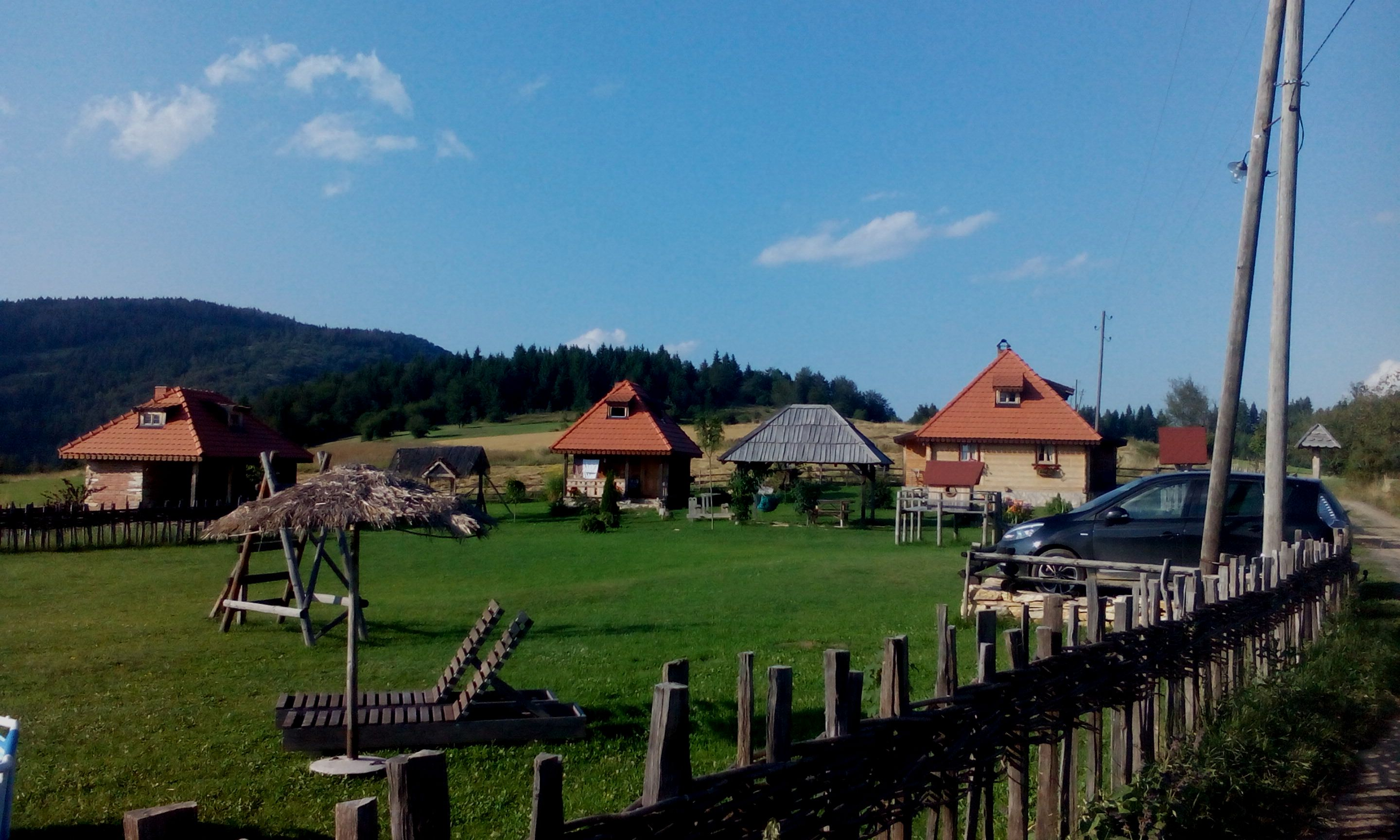
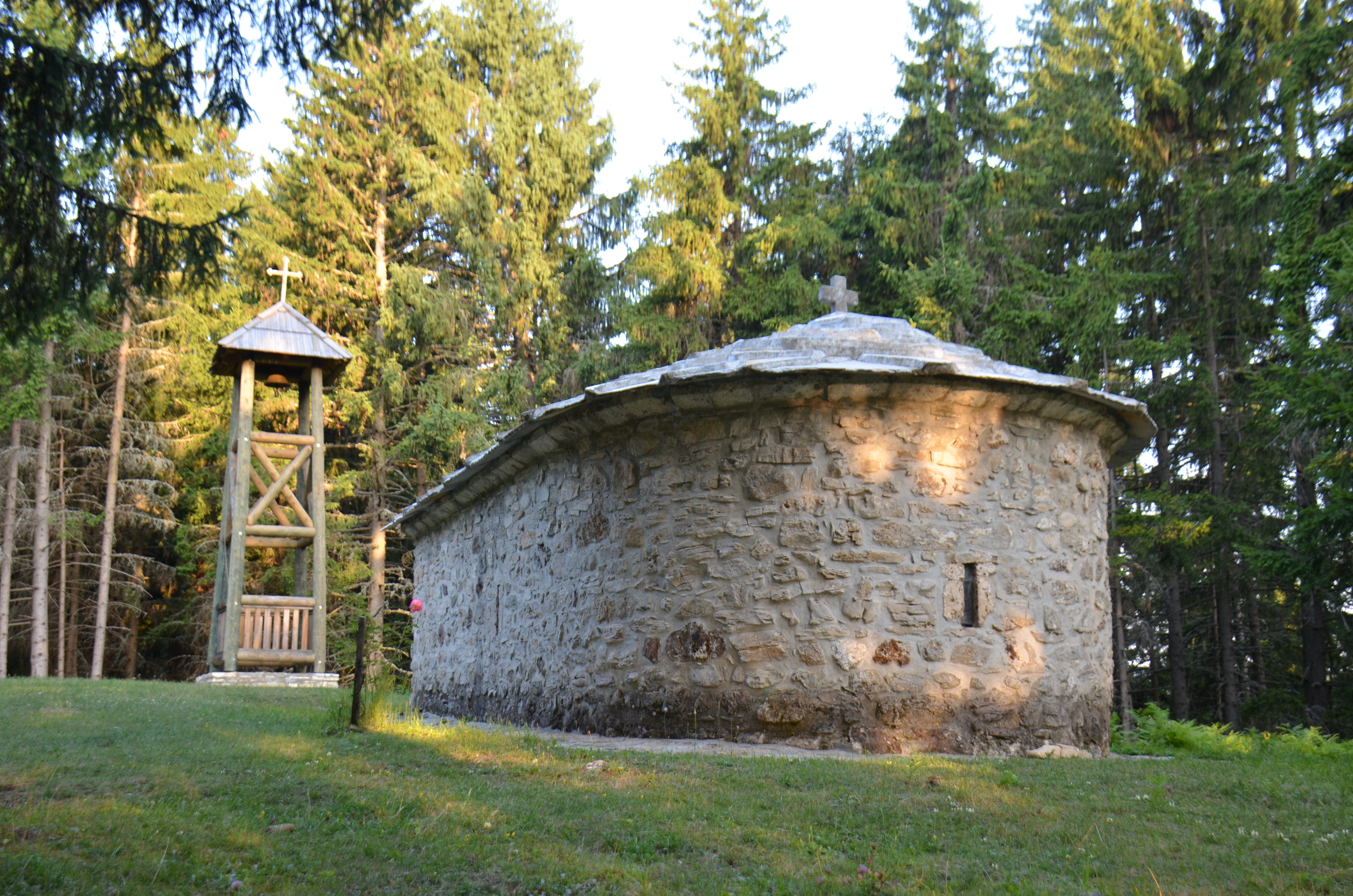
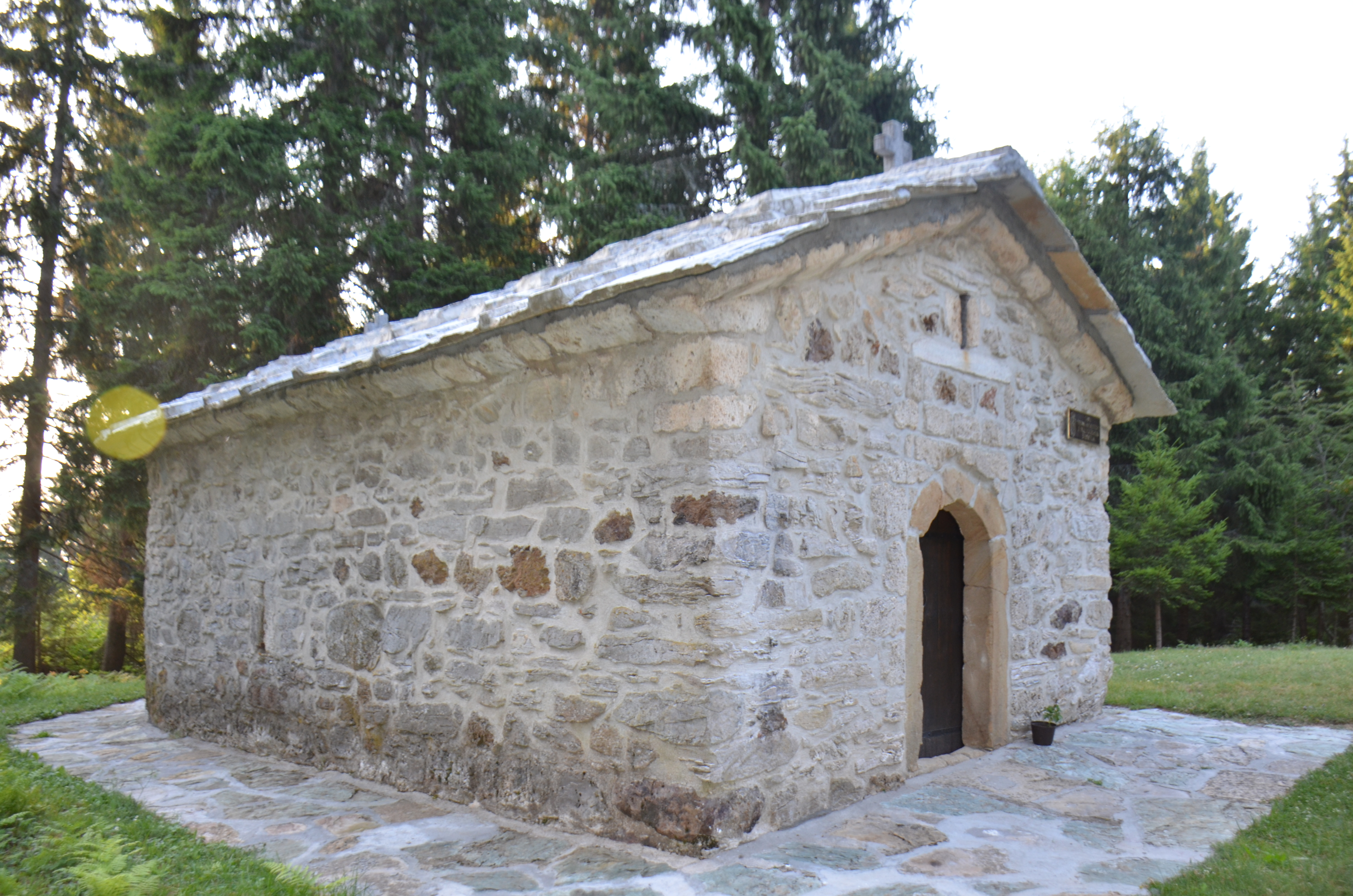
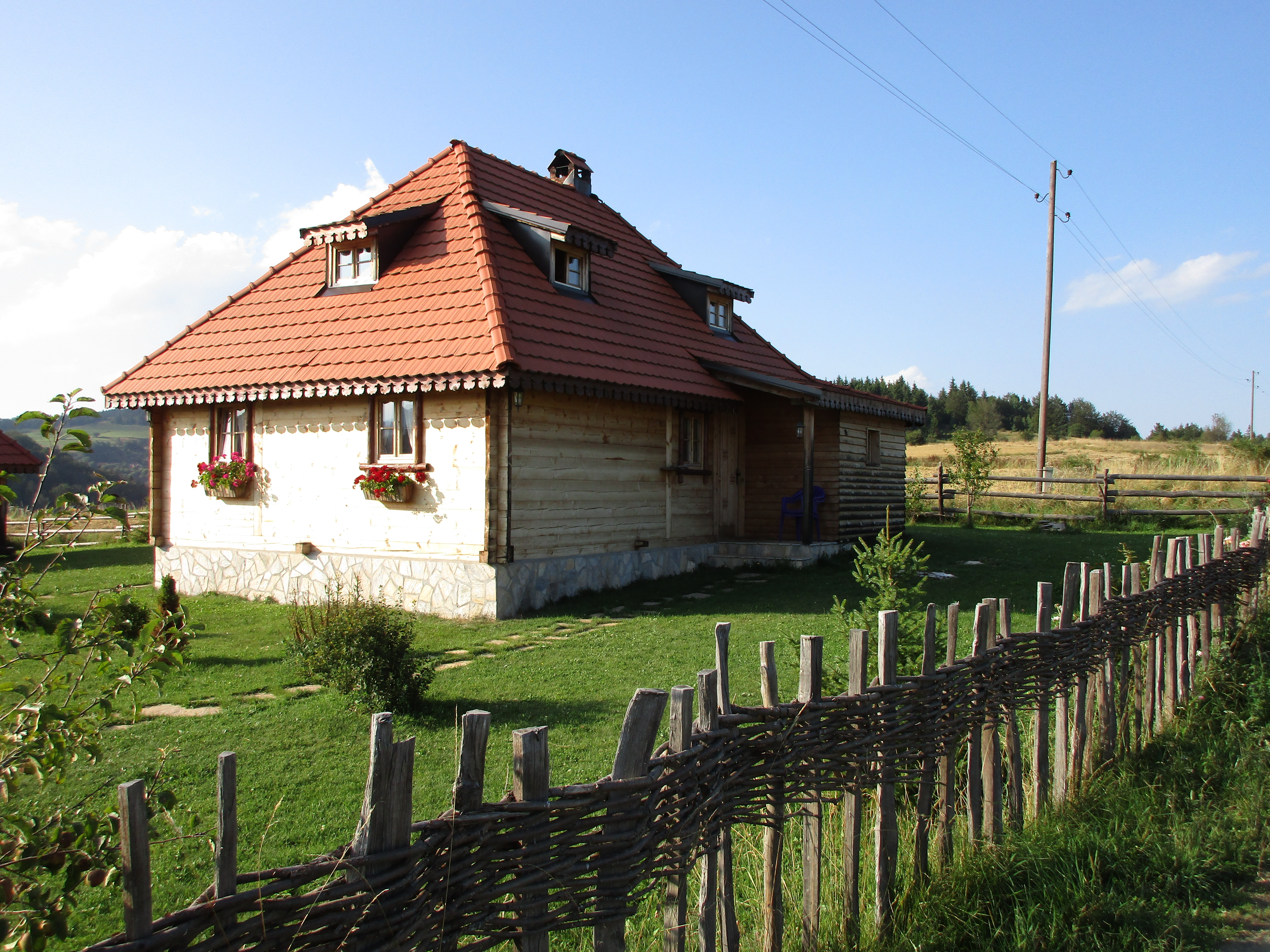
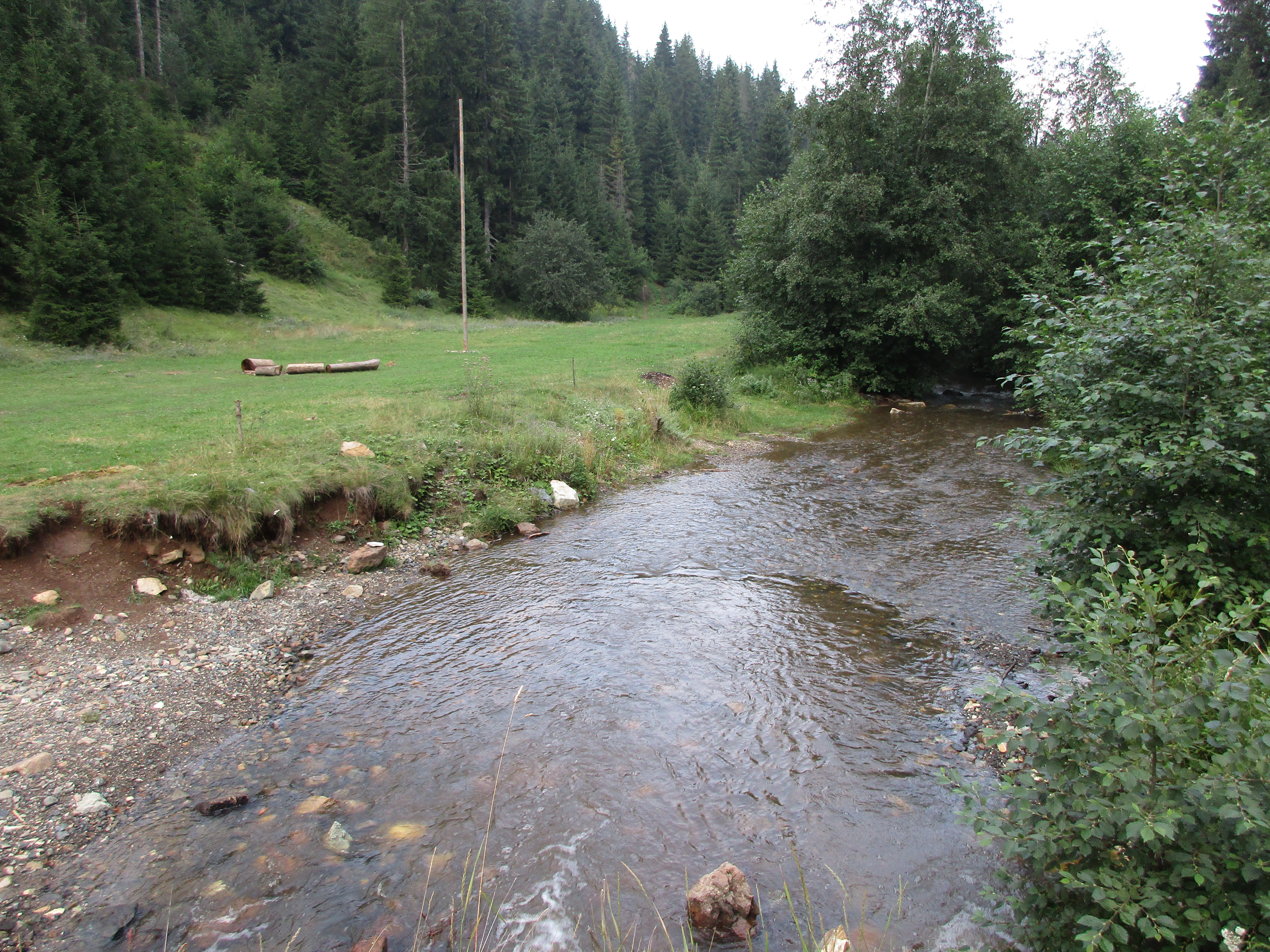
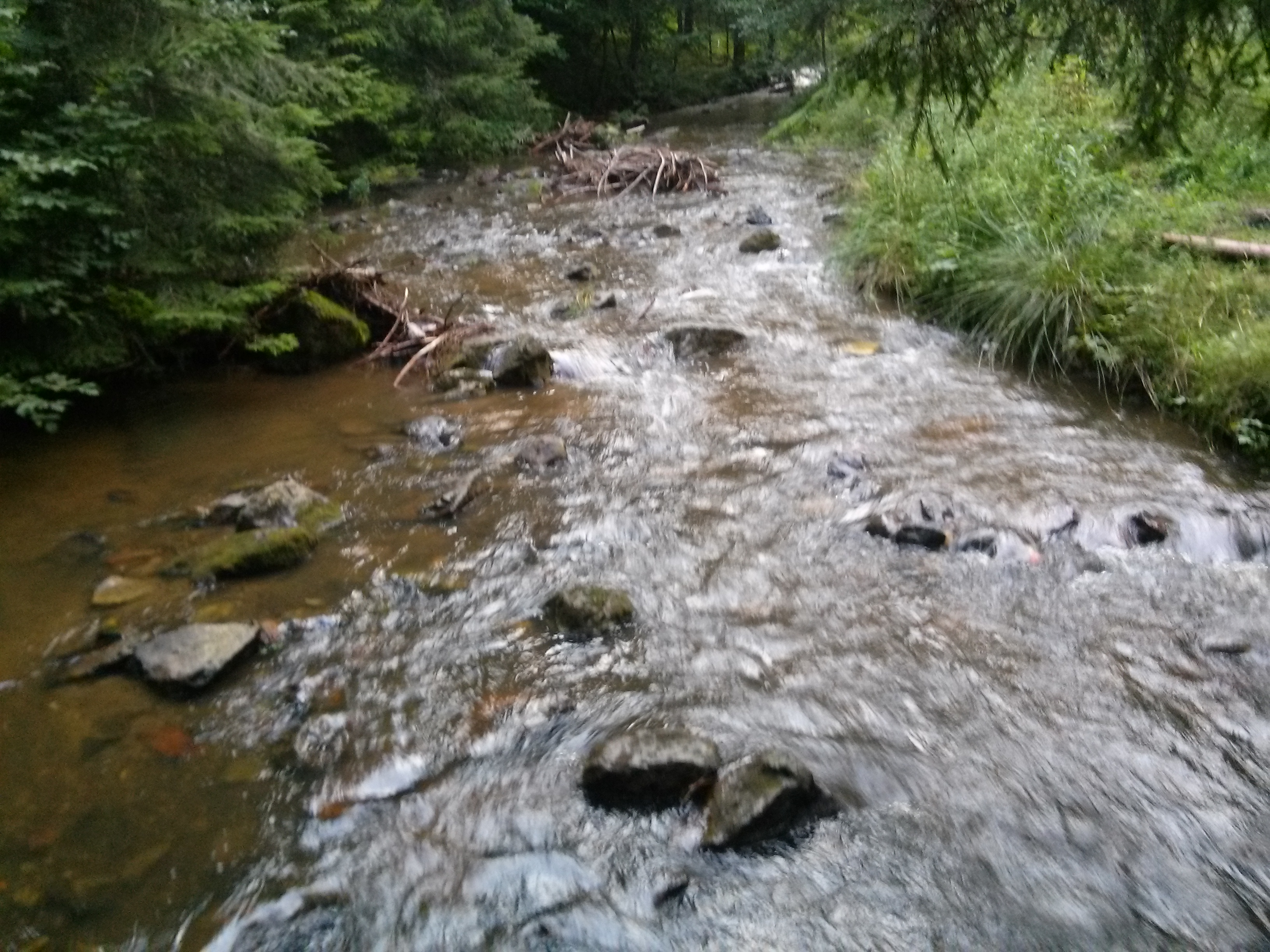
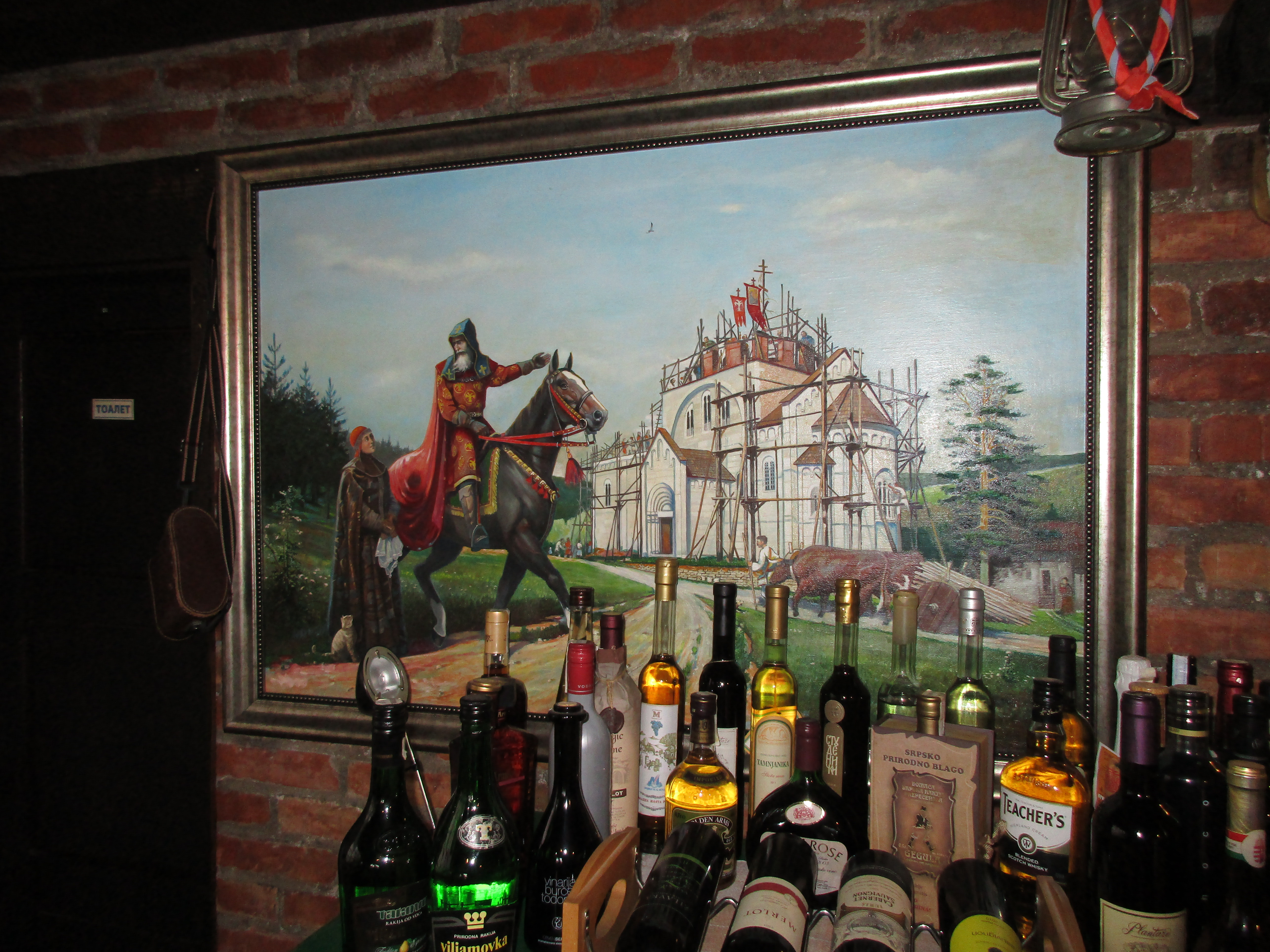
- Interactive map of Rudno
- Country: Serbia
- Municipality: Kraljevo
- Time zone: UTC+1 (CET)
  - Summer (DST): UTC+2 (CEST)

Rudno is a village situated in Kraljevo municipality in Serbia.
