= Zaklopača (Kraljevo) =

Coordinates: 43°41′N 20°46′E

Zaklopača Заклопача (Serbian)
- Village (Selo)
- Interactive map of Zaklopača
- Country: Serbia
- District: Raška District
- Municipality: Kraljevo
- Time zone: UTC+1 (CET)
  - Summer (DST): UTC+2 (CEST)

Zaklopača is a village situated in Kraljevo municipality in Serbia.
