= Popovići, Serbia =

Coordinates: 43°46′34″N 20°39′34″E

Popovići Поповићи (Serbian)
- Village (Selo)
- Interactive map of Popovići
- Country: Serbia
- District: Raška District
- Municipality: Kraljevo
- Time zone: UTC+1 (CET)
  - Summer (DST): UTC+2 (CEST)

Popovići is a village situated in Kraljevo municipality in Serbia.
