= Kovanluk =

Coordinates: 43°42′N 20°42′E

Kovanluk Кованлук (Serbian)
- Interactive map of Kovanluk
- Country: Serbia
- Time zone: UTC+1 (CET)
  - Summer (DST): UTC+2 (CEST)

Kovanluk is a suburban community in the municipality of Kraljevo, Serbia. It is located 3.5 kilometers from the city center and has about 5,000 inhabitants, most of whom settled there after leaving neighboring communities.

There is a large customs facility and warehouse complex in Kovanluk that was opened by the Serbian Government in 2012.
