= Sibnica (Kraljevo) =

Coordinates: 43°50′N 20°47′E

Sibnica Сибница (Serbian)
- Village (Selo)
- Interactive map of Sibnica
- Country: Serbia
- Municipality: Kraljevo
- Time zone: UTC+1 (CET)
  - Summer (DST): UTC+2 (CEST)

Sibnica is a village situated in Kraljevo municipality in Serbia.
