= Gledić =

Gledić Гледић (Serbian)
- Village (Selo)
- Interactive map of Gledić
- Coordinates: 43°49′31″N 20°52′28″E
- Country: Serbia
- District: Raška District
- Municipality: Kraljevo
- Elevation: 1,740 ft (530 m)

Population (2002)
  - Total: 352
- Time zone: UTC+1 (CET)
  - Summer (DST): UTC+2 (CEST)

Gledić is a village in the municipality of Kraljevo, western-central Serbia. According to the 2002 census, the village has a population of 352 people. It is home to the Gledić mountains.
