= Ravanica (Kraljevo) =

Coordinates: 43°44′N 20°53′E

Ravanica Раваница (Serbian)
- Village (Selo)
- Interactive map of Ravanica
- Country: Serbia
- Municipality: Kraljevo
- Time zone: UTC+1 (CET)
  - Summer (DST): UTC+2 (CEST)

Ravanica is a village situated in Kraljevo municipality in Serbia.
