= Polumir =

Coordinates: 43°31′N 20°36′E

Polumir Полумир (Serbian)
- Village (Selo)
- Interactive map of Polumir
- Country: Serbia
- District: Raška District
- Municipality: Kraljevo
- Time zone: UTC+1 (CET)
  - Summer (DST): UTC+2 (CEST)

A road in Polumir

Polumir is a village situated in Kraljevo municipality in Serbia.
