= Lozno (Kraljevo) =

Coordinates: 43°26′N 20°39′E

Lozno Лозно (Serbian)
- Village (Selo)
- Interactive map of Lozno
- Country: Serbia
- District: Raška District
- Municipality: Kraljevo
- Time zone: UTC+1 (CET)
  - Summer (DST): UTC+2 (CEST)

Lozno is a village situated in Kraljevo municipality in Serbia.
