= Immovable Cultural Heritage of Great Importance (Serbia) =

Immovable Cultural Heritage of Great Importance (Serbian: Непокретна културна добра од великог значаја / Nepokretna kulturna dobra od velikog značaja) are those objects of Immovable cultural heritage that enjoy the second-highest level of state protection in the Republic of Serbia, behind the Immovable Cultural Heritage of Exceptional Importance. Immovable Cultural Heritage is classified as being of Great Importance upon decision by the National Assembly of Serbia. They are inscribed in the Central Register of Immovable cultural property maintained by the Institute for the Protection of Cultural Monuments of Serbia. Objects of Immovable cultural heritage have to fulfill one or more of those criteria defined in the Law on Cultural Heritage of 1994 in order to be categorized as being "of great importance":

1. importance for a certain area or time-span;
2. evidence of social or natural development, or the socio-economic and cultural-historic development conditions during a certain time-span;
3. evidence about important historic events or persons from the national history.

According to the Law, there are four classes of Immovable Cultural Heritage: Cultural Monuments, Archaeological Sites, Historic Landmarks and Spatial Cultural-Historical Units. Objects in each of those classes can be categorized as being "of great importance" by the National Assembly.

== List of Cultural Heritage of Great Importance ==
There are currently 2657 objects of immovable cultural heritage inscribed in the Central Register, 582 of which are categorized as being "of great importance" (512 cultural monuments, 25 archaeological sites, 17 historic landmarks and 28 spatial cultural-historical units).

=== Cultural monuments of Great Importance ===
Number in the Central Register	Picture	Name	City/Municipality	Location address	designated cultural heritage	Great importance since	Comment
SK 4		Božić family House	Belgrade / Stari Grad	Belgrade Gospodar Jevremova St. no. 19	2 December 1946	7 April 1979	
SK 9		Türbe of Sheikh Mustapha	Belgrade / Stari Grad	Belgrade Višnjićeva St. no. 1	2 December 1946	7 April 1979	
SK 11		Prince Mihailo Monument	Belgrade / Stari Grad	Belgrade Republic Square	12 March 1965	7 April 1979	
SK 13		Bajrakli Mosque	Belgrade / Stari Grad	Belgrade Gospodar Jevremova St. no. 11	1 November 1962	7 April 1979	
SK 14		Late Roman Mausoleum in Brestovik	Belgrade / Grocka	Brestovik	12 February 1948	7 April 1979	
SK 16		Old Inn of Sopot	Belgrade / Sopot	Sopot Lenjinova St. no. 48	27 November 1948	7 April 1979	
SK 20		Rakovica Monastery	Belgrade / Rakovica	Belgrade Patrijarha Dimitrija St. no 34	26 October 1949	7 April 1979	
SK 22		Karamata Family House	Belgrade / Zemun	Zemun Matije Gupca St. no. 17	21 December 1950	7 April 1979	
SK 23		Birth-house of Dimitrije Davidović	Belgrade / Zemun	Zemun Glavna St. no. 6	27 February 1951	7 April 1979	
SK 30		Jevrem Grujić House	Belgrade / Stari Grad	Belgrade Lole Ribara St. no. 17	13 February 1961	7 April 1979	
SK 31		Nikola Spasić Endowment	Belgrade / Stari Grad	Belgrade Knez Mihailova St. no. 33	17 November 1961	7 April 1979	
SK 32		Jovan Cvijić House	Belgrade / Stari Grad	Belgrade Jelene Ćetković St. no. 5	4 February 1963	7 April 1979	
SK 33		Manak House	Belgrade / Savski Venac	Belgrade Kraljevića Marka St. no. 12	9 May 1963	7 April 1979	
SK 36		Krsmanović House at Terazije	Belgrade / Stari Grad	Belgrade Terazije St. no. 34	17 March 1964	7 April 1979	
SK 37		First Town Hospital	Belgrade / Stari Grad	Belgrade Džordža Vašingtona St. no. 19	29 June 1964	7 April 1979	
SK 38		National Museum	Belgrade / Stari Grad	Belgrade Republic Square no. 1	30 June 1964	7 April 1979	
SK 39		Realka High School	Belgrade / Stari Grad	Belgrade Uzun Mirkova St. no. 14	3 August 1964	7 April 1979	
SK 40		Third Belgrade Gymnasium Building	Belgrade / Vračar	Belgrade Njegoševa St. no. 15	14 September 1964	7 April 1979	
SK 41		Monument of Gratitude to France	Belgrade / Stari Grad	Belgrade Kalemegdan	5 February 1965	21 July 1983	
SK 46		Old House at Varoš Kapija	Belgrade / Stari Grad	Belgrade Gračanička St. no. 10	13 April 1965	7 April 1979	
SK 47		Ministry of Justice Building	Belgrade / Stari Grad	Belgrade Terazije St. no. 41	14 April 1965	7 April 1979	
SK 48		Smederevska Banka Building	Belgrade / Stari Grad	Belgrade Terazije St. no. 39	20 April 1965	7 April 1979	
SK 53		National Bank	Belgrade / Stari Grad	Belgrade: 7. jula St. no. 12	18 May 1965	7 April 1979	
SK 59		Doctor's Tower	Belgrade / Savski Venac	Belgrade Kneza Miloša St. no. 103	13 October 1965	7 April 1979	
SK 62		Wooden Church in Vranić	Belgrade / Barajevo	Vranić	23 December 1965	7 April 1979	
SK 65		Ičko's House	Belgrade / Zemun	Zemun Bežanijska kosa no. 18	31 December 1965	7 April 1979	
SK 69		Rančić family House	Belgrade / Grocka	Grocka Majevička St. no. 9	27 June 1966	7 April 1979	
SK 73		Tsintsar House	Belgrade / Grocka	Grocka: 17. Oktobra St. no. 9	30 June 1966	7 April 1979	
SK 86		Belgrade Cooperative Building	Belgrade / Savski Venac	Belgrade Karađorđeva St. no. 48	27 December 1966	7 April 1979	
SK 87		Ministry of Education Building (House of Vuk's Foundation)	Belgrade / Stari Grad	Belgrade Kralja Milana St. no. 2	29 December 1966	7 April 1979	
SK 89		Army Officers' Cooperative Building	Belgrade / Savski Venac	Belgrade Masarikova St. no. 4	30 December 1966	7 April 1979	
SK 96		Pavlovac Monastery	Belgrade / Mladenovac	Koraćica	19 October 1973	21 July 1983	
SK 99		Atina Building (Atina Palace)	Belgrade / Stari Grad	Belgrade Terazije St. no. 28	28 June 1968	21 July 1983	
SK 103		Old Telephone Exchange Building	Belgrade / Stari Grad	Belgrade Kosovska St. no. 47	27 December 1968	7 April 1979	
SK 104		First Serbian Observatory Building	Belgrade / Savski Venac	Belgrade Bulevar JNA St.	30 December 1968	7 April 1979	
SK 105		Moskva Hotel	Belgrade / Stari Grad	Belgrade Balkanska St. no. 1	30 December 1968	7 April 1979	
SK 109		Mihailović family House	Belgrade / Obrenovac	Obrenovac Maršala Tita St. no. 184	25 February 1970	7 April 1979	
SK 113		Pantelić Foundry	Belgrade / Zemun	Zemun Gajeva St. no. 15	20 October 1971	7 April 1979	
SK 114		Fenek monastery	Belgrade / Surčin	Jakovo Boljevački put	22 September 1950	7 April 1979	
SK 124		Monument of Prince Stanoje	Belgrade / Lazarevac	Zeoke	3 April 1974	21 July 1983	
SK 126		Birth House of Vojvoda Stepa Stepanović	Belgrade / Voždovac	Belgrade Kumodraž	24 October 1974	21 July 1983	
SK 127		Rajinovac Monastery	Belgrade / Grocka	Begaljica Begaljica nn.	28 October 1974	21 July 1983	
SK 139		Sisojevac Monastery	Paraćin	Sisevac	29 March 1951	7 April 1979	
SK 141		Drača Monastery	Kragujevac	Drača	11 June 1955	7 April 1979	
SK 142		Jošanica Monastery	Jagodina	Jošanički Prnjavor	19 February 1952	7 April 1979	
SK 143		Voljavča Monastery	Kragujevac	Stragari	18 March 1949	7 April 1979	
SK 145		Wooden Church of Rača	Rača	Rača	19 September 1949	7 April 1979	
SK 153		Church of St. Nicholas	Topola	Donja Šatornja	28 March 1969	21 July 1983	
SK 165		Novi Pazar Medieval Fortress	Novi Pazar	Novi Pazar	14 November 1947	7 April 1979	
SK 166		Jeleč Medieval Town	Novi Pazar	Grubetiće	17 November 1947	7 April 1979	
SK 169		Stalać Medieval Town	Ćićevac	Stalać	8 March 1948	7 April 1979	
SK 170		Nova Pavlica Church	Raška	Pavlica	11 March 1948	7 April 1979	
SK 171		Stara Pavlica Church	Raška	Pavlica	30 March 1948	7 April 1979	
SK 172		Koznik Medieval Town	Brus	Milentija	29 June 1948	7 April 1979	
SK 175		Veluće Monastery	Trstenik	Veluće	17 August 1948	7 April 1979	
SK 176		Rudenica Monastery	Aleksandrovac	Rudenice	17 August 1948	7 April 1979	
SK 177		Drenča Monastery	Aleksandrovac	Drenča	17 August 1948	7 April 1979	
SK 184		Crna Reka Monastery	Tutin	Ribariće	25 December 1948	7 April 1979	
SK 185		Ježevica Monastery	Čačak	Banjica	18 March 1949	21 July 1983	
SK 186		Bela crkva Karanska (White Church of Karan)	Užice	Karan	18 March 1949	7 April 1979	
SK 187		Naupara Monastery	Kruševac	Naupare	18 March 1949	7 April 1979	
SK 188		Vraćevšnica Monastery	Gornji Milanovac	Vraćevšnica	18 March 1949	7 April 1979	
SK 197		Wooden Church	Gornji Milanovac	Ljutovnica	29 March 1948	14 April 2000	
SK 199		Wooden Church	Kosjerić	Seča Reka	20 December 1948	5 December 1987	
SK 200		Wooden Church	Nova Varoš	Kućani	22 December 1948	7 April 1979	
SK 201		Wooden Church	Čajetina	Jablanica	22 December 1948	7 April 1979	
SK 203		Wooden Church	Kraljevo	Cvetke	10 February 1949	7 April 1979	The complex also includes the nearby graveyard.
SK 204		Wooden Church	Gornji Milanovac	Pranjani	18 October 1949	14 April 2000	
SK 205		Kurvingrad Medieval Fortress	Doljevac	Malošište	17 November 1947	7 April 1979	
SK 209		Monastery of the Holy Mother of God	Leskovac	Golema Njiva	24 November 1947	21 July 1983	
SK 210		Monastery of St. John	Leskovac	Jašunja	25 November 1947	21 July 1983	
SK 211		Soko Grad Medieval Fortress	Sokobanja	Sokobanja	29 June 1948	7 April 1979	
SK 212		Temska Monastery	Pirot	Temska	8 March 1948	21 July 1983	
SK 213		Rudare Monastery	Leskovac	Rudare	15 March 1948	21 July 1983	
SK 214		Lapušnja Monastery	Boljevac	Lukovo	19 March 1948	21 July 1983	
SK 215		Koroglaš Monastery	Negotin	Miloševo	20 March 1948	21 July 1983	
SK 216		Holy Trinity Monastery	Knjaževac	Gornja Kamenica	24 March 1948	21 July 1983	
SK 217		Church of the Holy Mother of God	Knjaževac	Donja Kamenica	25 March 1948	7 April 1979	
SK 220		Church of St. Mina	Kuršumlija	Štava	15 March 1949	21 July 1983	
SK 222		Poganovo Monastery	Dimitrovgrad	Poganovo	21 September 1949	7 April 1979	
SK 225		St. Stevan's Monastery	Aleksinac	Lipovac Lipovački put	23 August 1951	21 July 1983	
SK 226		Grad – Pirot Medieval Fortress	Pirot	Pirot	16 February 1953	7 April 1979	
SK 227		Church of the Holy Mother of God – Vražji kamen	Trgovište	Donja Trnica	14 May 1958	21 July 1983	
SK 228		Latin Church	Niš / Pantelej	Gornji Matejevac	21 October 1963	21 July 1983	
SK 230		Monastery of the Holy Mother of God	Niš / Niška Banja	Sićevo	18 December 1963	21 July 1983	
SK 231		Church of St. Parascheva	Pirot	Staničenje	9 May 1967	7 April 1979	
SK 236		Ajdanovac Monastery	Prokuplje	Zdravinje	31 March 1970	21 July 1983	
SK 243		Old church of the Holy Mother of God	Negotin	Negotin	2 June 1967	7 April 1979	
SK 246		Annunciation Monastery of the Rudnik Mountain (Blagovešenje Rudničko)	Kragujevac	Stragari	9 July 1949	7 April 1979	
SK 248		Church of St. Nicholas	Kragujevac	Ramaća	11 June 1955	7 April 1979	
SK 249		Srebrenica Medieval Town	Kragujevac	Stragari	19 March 1969	21 July 1983	
SK 252		Church of the Presentation of the Mother of God	Ub	Dokmir	12 October 1949 (stone monument near the church) 25 September 1967 (whole church)	5 December 1987	
SK 253		Birth House of Vojvoda Živojin Mišić	Mionica	Struganik	22 April 1970	21 July 1983	
SK 256		Nenadović Tower in Kličevac	Valjevo	Valjevo	4 June 1951	21 July 1983	
SK 262		Church in Slavkovica	Ljig	Slavkovica	14 February 1977	21 July 1983	
SK 264		Church of the Birth of St. John (Jovanja monastery)	Valjevo	Zlatarić	16 November 1967	21 July 1983	
SK 265		Bogovađa Monastery	Lajkovac	Bogovađa	18 March 1949	7 April 1979	
SK 284		Fetislam Fortress	Kladovo	Kladovo	27 October 1964	7 April 1979	
SK 285		Turkish Hammam of Vranje	Vranje	Vranje	29 June 1948	7 April 1979	
SK 289		Niš Fortress	Niš / Crveni Krst	Niš Crveni Krst	6 May 1948	7 April 1979	
SK 291		Pasha's House	Vranje	Vranje	2 February 1949	7 April 1979	
SK 293		Borislav Stanković House	Vranje	Vranje Baba Zlatina St.	2 March 1950	7 April 1979	
SK 296		Vlajinac House	Vranje	Vranje	7 September 1965	21 July 1983	
SK 298		Bela mačka (White cat) Building	Pirot	Pirot Dušana Paskovića St. no. 28	30 May 1967	7 April 1979	
SK 304		Officers Club Building	Niš / Medijana	Niš Orlovića Pavla St. no. 28	25 February 1970	7 April 1979	
SK 305		Old Church of the Holy Ascension	Gadžin Han	Veliki Krčimir	13 August 1970	21 July 1983	
SK 307		Marina kula (Mara's Tower) Medieval Fortress	Kuršumlija	Kastrat	15 September 1970	21 July 1983	
SK 318		Giga House	Vlasotince	Vlasotince Ive Lole Ribara St. no. 2	24 July 1979	5 December 1987	
SK 322		Čukljenik Monastery	Leskovac	Čukljenik	10 July 1980	21 July 1983	
SK 326		Šop Đokić House	Leskovac	Leskovac	19 May 1949	5 December 1987	
SK 345		The Foundry Building and the Blacksmith Shop	Kragujevac	Kragujevac	29 April 1953	7 April 1979	
SK 346		Gymnasium Building	Kragujevac	Kragujevac Braće Hadžića St. no. 1	19 May 1970	7 April 1979	
SK 347		Memorial House	Mionica	Robaje	20 April 1979	21 July 1983	
SK 361		Čokešina Monastery	Loznica	Čokešina	22 December 1948	5 December 1987	
SK 362		Ćelije Monastery	Valjevo	Lelić	10 November 1950	7 April 1979	
SK 363		Tronoša Monastery	Loznica	Korenita	22 December 1948	7 April 1979	
SK 364		Holy Transfiguration Church	Šabac	Krivaja	24 July 1964	5 December 1987	
SK 367		Užice Medieval Town	Užice	Užice	24 October 1949	7 April 1979	
SK 368		Amir Aga's Inn	Novi Pazar	Novi Pazar Rifata Burdževića St. no. 2	23 November 1949	7 April 1979	
SK 371		Nikolje Monastery	Čačak	Rošci	8 November 1950	7 April 1979	
SK 372		Blagoveštenje (Annunciation) Monastery	Čačak	Ovčar Banja	8 November 1950	7 April 1979	
SK 375		Davidovica Monastery	Prijepolje	Brodarevo	26 January 1952	7 April 1979	
SK 378		Vujan Monastery	Čačak	Prislonica	18 April 1962	7 April 1979	
SK 380		Church of the Holy Trinity	Gornji Milanovac	Gornji Milanovac	23 July 1966	14 April 2000	
SK 381		Church of Sv. Sava with a Belfry and Two Chardaks	Gornji Milanovac	Šarani Savinac	23 July 1966	21 July 1983	
SK 382		Monastery of the Holy Trinity	Lučani	Dučalovići	27 April 1967	7 April 1979	
SK 383		Church of St. Nicholas	Ivanjica	Brezova	17 March 1967	21 July 1983	
SK 384		Sretenje (Presentation of the Christ) Monastery	Lučani	Dučalovići	26 January 1968	7 April 1979	
SK 389		District Authorities Building	Gornji Milanovac	Gornji Milanovac Kneza Mihaila Square	14 April 1970	21 July 1983	
SK 403		District Authorities Building	Čačak	Čačak Cara Dušana St. no. 1	11 February 1974	7 April 1979	
SK 418		Main Railway Station	Belgrade / Savski Venac	Belgrade Savski Square no. 1	17 September 1981	21 July 1983	
SK 428		National Theatre Building	Belgrade / Stari Grad	Belgrade Francuska St. no. 3	3 February 1983	21 July 1983	
SK 451		Pustinja Monastery	Valjevo	Poćuta	19 September 1949	7 April 1979	
SK 484		Residence of Gospodar Jovan	Čačak	Čačak Cara Dušana St. no. 24	4 March 1950	7 April 1979	
SK 494		Holy Transfiguration Church	Ivanjica	Pridvorica	10 July 1954	21 July 1983	
SK 510		Lužanin House	Čačak	Miokovci	14 May 1975	7 April 1979	
SK 530		Gavrović Chardak	Gornji Milanovac	Pranjani	13 November 1981	21 July 1983	
SK 535		Church of the Ascension of Christ	Čačak	Čačak Cara Dušana St. no. 2	16 November 1982	5 December 1987	
SK 541		Ram Fortress	Veliko Gradište	Ram	28 February 1948	7 April 1979	
SK 543		Church in Trg	Žagubica	Milatovac	26 March 1951	7 April 1979	
SK 546		Požarevac Town Hall	Požarevac	Požarevac	30 December 1980	21 July 1983	
SK 548		Vitovnica Monastery	Petrovac	Vitovnica	31 December 1970	21 July 1983	
SK 569		Gornjak Monastery	Žagubica	Gornjak near Krepoljin	18 July 1973	7 April 1979	
SK 570		Fulling House in Bistrica (Valjavica)	Petrovac	Bistrica	30 March 1982	5 December 1987	
SK 576		Old Hospital Building	Šabac	Šabac Corner of Vojvode Mišića St. and Popa Karana St.	5 August 1971	7 April 1979	
SK 582		Brankovina Church	Valjevo	Brankovina	17 April 1950	7 April 1979	
SK 588		Old School	Valjevo	Brankovina	11 June 1949	7 April 1979	
SK 719		Gymnasium Building	Šabac	Šabac Masarikova St. no. 13	14 July 1955	7 April 1979	
SK 740		Šabac Fortress	Šabac	Šabac	28 August 1947	7 April 1979	
SK 785		New Cemetery	Belgrade / Zvezdara	Belgrade Ruzveltova St. no. 50	9 July 1987	21 July 1983	
SK 969		St. Nicholas' Church	Gornji Milanovac	Brusnica	28 June 1991	14 April 2000	
SK 978		Altun-Alem Mosque	Novi Pazar	Novi Pazar Jugovića St.	26 January 1949	7 April 1979	
SK 1085		Vladimirovac Wells	Alibunar	Vladimirovac	18 July 1990	30 December 1991	
SK 1086		Serbian Orthodox Church Iconostasis	Alibunar	Ilandža Svetog Save St. no. 8	26 August 1950	30 December 1991	
SK 1087		St. Paul's Roman Catholic Church	Bač	Bač JNA St. no. 5	14 July 1970	30 December 1991	
SK 1088		Bač Hammam	Bač	Bač Jugoslovenske narodne armije St. no. 8	1 November 1971	30 December 1991	
SK 1089		Serbian Orthodox Church Iconostasis	Bačka Palanka	Neštin Crkvenoškolsa St. no. 27	27 December 1950	30 December 1991	
SK 1090		Neštin Watermill	Bačka Palanka	Neštin	25 October 1971	30 December 1991	The Watermill is in the extreme state of disrepair.
SK 1092		Two Castles complex (Stratimirović Castle and Dunđerski Castle)	Bački Petrovac	Kulpin Oslobođenja Square no. 7	27 April 1970	30 December 1991	
SK 1093		Serbian Orthodox Church Iconostasis	Beočin	Banoštor Crkvena St. no. 1	4 July 1970	30 December 1991	
SK 1094		Serbian Orthodox Church Iconostasis and Wall Paintings	Beočin	Beočin Stojana Vukosavljevića St. no 67	3 May 1972	30 December 1991	
SK 1095		Serbian Orthodox Church Iconostasis and Wall Paintings	Beočin	Čerević Milenka Šerbana St. no. 8	4 April 1972	30 December 1991	
SK 1096		Lazarević Castle	Vršac	Veliko Središte	20 August 1962	30 December 1991	
SK 1097		Vršac Tower	Vršac	Vršac	30 August 1948	30 December 1991	
SK 1098		Birth House of Jovan Sterija Popović	Vršac	Vršac Save Kovačevića Square no. 1	27 July 1977	30 December 1991	
SK 1099		Čurug Windmill	Žabalj	Čurug Svetozara Miletića St. no. 90	15 August 1962	30 December 1991	
SK 1109		St. Nicholas' Church	Novi Sad	Novi Sad Nikolajevska porta (Đure Jakšića St.)	6 August 1948 (iconostasis) 18 May 1959 (whole building)	30 December 1991	
SK 1110		Club of Yugoslav Peoples' Army	Novi Sad	Novi Sad Slobode Square no. 5	22 June 1983	30 December 1991	
SK 1111		Sebian Orthodox Church	Novi Sad	Rumenka Arsenija Čarnojevića St. (Veljka Vlahovića St.)	4 August 1970	30 December 1991	
SK 1113		Jagodić Castle	Plandište	Stari Lec	1 March 1989	30 December 1991	
SK 1114		Hajdučica Castle	Plandište	Hajdučica	30 January 1984	30 December 1991	
SK 1116		Serbian Orthodox Church of the Epiphany of the Lord	Srbobran	Srbobran Jovana Jovanovića Zmaja St. no. 15	20 December 1950 (iconostasis) 5 July 1962 (whole building)	30 December 1991	
SK 1117		Serbian Orthodox Church and Iconostasis	Vrbas	Vrbas Ise Sekičkog St. no. 69	3 August 1981	30 December 1991	
SK 1124		Kovilj Monastery	Novi Sad	Kovilj	4 August 1949	30 December 1991	
SK 1125		St. George's Cathedral Church	Novi Sad	Novi Sad Svetozara Markovića St.	6 August 1948	30 December 1991	
SK 1127		Church of St. John the Baptist	Bačka Palanka	Bačka Palanka Svetozara Mietića St. no. 63	12 December 1950	30 December 1991	
SK 1128		Slovak Evangelical Church and Parish House	Bački Petrovac	Bački Petrovac Maršala Tita St. no. 8	10 November 1981	30 December 1991	
SK 1129		St. Peter and Paul's Serbian Orthodox Church	Bela Crkva	Bela Crkva	22 May 1959	30 December 1991	
SK 1131		Serbian Orthodox Church in Despotovo	Bačka Palanka	Despotovo Krađorđeva St. no. 82	19 March 1958	30 December 1991	
SK 1134		Serbian Orthodox Church of the Dormition of the Virgin	Bačka Palanka	Pivnice Vojvođanska St. no. 42	24 March 1958	30 December 1991	
SK 1137		Serbian Orthodox Church	Novi Sad / Petrovaradin	Sremska Kamenica Karađorđeva St. (Srvene Armije St.)	15 July 1949	30 December 1991	
SK 1138		Kapetanovo Castle	Plandište	Stari Lec	26 June 1985	30 December 1991	
SK 1139		Baron Jovanović Castle	Vršac	Sočica Jablaničla St. no. 1	21 July 1981	30 December 1991	
SK 1141		Stara apoteka (Old Pharmacy) Building	Vršac	Vršac: 29. Novembra St. (Stefana Nemanje St.) no. 1	22 June 1970	30 December 1991	
SK 1144		House of Jovan Jovanović Zmaj	Novi Sad / Petrovaradin	Sremska Kamenica Zmaj Jovina St. no. 1	20 May 1948	30 December 1991	
SK 1148		House at Stankovićeva Street no. 4	Beočin	Beočin Ljube Stankovića St. no. 4	18 March 1965	30 December 1991	
SK 1149		Partisan Base	Novi Sad	Novi Sad Vojislava Ilića St. no. 15	26 November 1964	30 December 1991	
SK 1150		Kovin Medieval Fortress	Kovin	Kovin	17 April 1948	30 December 1991	
SK 1151		Three Military Frontier Buildings	Titel	Titel Maršala Tita St. no. 2 Maršala Tita St. no. 7 Oslobođenja Square no. 4	16 August 1950	30 December 1991	
SK 1152		Reformed Church	Vrbas	Vrbas Maršala Tita St. no. 84	3 August 1981	30 December 1991	
SK 1155		Roman Catholic Church and Old Rectory in Futog	Novi Sad	Futog Carice Milice St. (Lole Ribara St.)	23 January 1968 (five icons) 28 July 1970 (whole complex)	30 December 1991	
SK 1157		St. Cosmas and Damian's Church	Novi Sad	Futog Cara Lazara St. (Maršala Tita St.)	13 March 1972	30 December 1991	
SK 1158		Serbian Orthodox Church in Bukovac	Novi Sad / Petrovaradin	Bukovac Karađorđeva St. (Maršala Tita St.)	16 February 1978	30 December 1991	
SK 1159		18th Century House in Sremska Kamenica	Novi Sad / Petrovaradin	Sremska Kamenica Karađorđeva St. no. 21	8 November 1982	30 December 1991	
SK 1160		"Jovan Jovanović Zmaj" Gymnasium Building	Novi Sad	Novi Sad Zlatne grede St. no. 4	3 March 1982	30 December 1991	
SK 1161		Hungarian Reformed Church and Parish House Building	Novi Sad	Rumenka	4 August 1970	30 December 1991	
SK 1162		Two Old Turkish Fountains in Ledinci	Novi Sad	Ledinci	13 March 1967	30 December 1991	
SK 1163		Roman Catholic Parish Offise, Novi Sad Presbytery	Novi Sad	Novi Sad Katolička porta St. no. 3	10 July 1962	30 December 1991	
SK 1164		Vizić Estate	Novi Sad	Begeč	6 June 1974	30 December 1991	
SK 1165		Svetozar Miletić Monument	Novi Sad	Novi Sad Slobode Square	18 June 1949	30 December 1991	
SK 1166		Matica Srpska Building	Novi Sad	Novi Sad Matice Srpske St. no. 1	12 February 1973	30 December 1991	
SK 1167		Monument to the Warriors of the First World War	Novi Sad	Kovilj Solunskih dobrovoljaca Square (L. Kostića Square)	10 April 1968	30 December 1991	
SK 1168		Remains of The Medieval Church at the Klisa Site	Novi Sad / Petrovaradin	Ledinci Stari Ledinci	1 April 1969	30 December 1991	
SK 1186		Church of Translation of the Relics of St. Nicholas	Bečej	Bačko Petrovo Selo Patrijarha Vićentija Prodanova St. no. 55	21 April 1951	30 December 1991	
SK 1187		Bogdan Dunđerski's Castle Chapel near Bečej (Fantast Castle Complex)	Bečej	Bečej Potes salaši no. 1	7 June 1948 (iconostasis) 17 February 2000 (whole building)	30 December 1991	
SK 1188		St. George's Church in Bečej	Bečej	Bečej Braće Tan St. no. 2 (Borisa Kidriča St. no. 11)	9 December 1949	30 December 1991	
SK 1192		Chapel of St. Anthony the Great	Bač	Bač outside of town	14 July 1970	30 December 1991	
SK 1193		Bač Nunnery	Bač	Bač JNA St. no. 3	14 July 1970	30 December 1991	
SK 1196		Chardak of Sviloš	Beočin	Sviloš Fruškogorska St. no 97	25 October 1971	30 December 1991	
SK 1197		St. Gabriel's Serbian Orthodox Church	Beočin	Susek Nikole Tesle St. no. 87	27 December 1950	30 December 1991	
SK 1206		Serbian Orthodox Church of St. John Chrysostom	Bačka Palanka	Silbaš Braće Novakov St. no. 7	17 April 1973	30 December 1991	
SK 1209		Serbian Orthodox Church of St. Elijah	Titel	Lok Branka Radičevića St. no. 15	27 January 1968	30 December 1991	
SK 1210		Titel House	Titel	Titel Maršala Tita St. (Glavna St.) no. 30(32)	12 September 1950	30 December 1991	
SK 1212		Vrbas Building	Vrbas	Vrbas Maršala Tita St. no. 42	27 June 1984	30 December 1991	
SK 1214		National Brewery Building	Pančevo	Pančevo Nikole Tesle St. no. 2	21 June 1948	30 December 1991	
SK 1279		Serbian Orthodox Church of the Presentation of the Virgin	Inđija	Beška	13 June 1973	30 December 1991	
SK 1280		Serbian Orthodox Church of the Presentation of the Virgin	Inđija	Inđija	7 May 1970	30 December 1991	Geographic coordinated in the Central register erroneously locate this church in Beška instead of Inđija.
SK 1281		St. Peter's Roman Catholic Church	Inđija	Inđija	24 January 1977	30 December 1991	
SK 1426		Church of Translation of the Relics of St. Nicholas (Upper Small Church)	Pančevo	Dolovo Dejana Brankova St. no. 3	17 March 1950 (isonostasis) 16 November 1966 (whole building)	30 December 1991	
SK 1427		Church of Translation of the Relics of St. Nicholas (Lower Large Church)	Pančevo	Dolovo Kralja Petra Prvog St. no. 3	15 August 1950	30 December 1991	
SK 1428		Magistrate Building	Pančevo	Pančevo Kralja Petra Square no. 7	21 June 1948	30 December 1991	
SK 1429		Building at Nikola Tesla Street no. 3	Pančevo	Pančevo Nikole Tesle st. no. 3	15 April 1970	30 December 1991	
SK 1430		Church of the Ascension	Pančevo	Pančevo Dimitrija Tucovića St. no. 8	21 June 1948	30 December 1991	
SK 1431		Building at JNA Street no. 2	Pančevo	Pančevo JNA St. (Vojvode Radomira Putnika St.) no. 2	2 April 1973	30 December 1991	
SK 1432		Building at Dimitrija Tucovića Street no. 2	Pančevo	Pančevo Dimitrija Tucovića St. no. 2	2 April 1973	30 December 1991	
SK 1433		Building at Borisa Kidriča Square no. 8-10 (Kralja Petra Square 8–10)	Pančevo	Pančevo Kralja Petra Square no. 8-10	2 April 1973	30 December 1991	
SK 1434		Building at Borisa Kidriča Square no.11 (Kralja Petra Square 11)	Pančevo	Pančevo Kralja Petra Square no. 11	2 April 1973	30 December 1991	
SK 1435		Romanian Orthodox Church of St. Theodore Tyron	Vršac	Kuštilj	23 July 1970	30 December 1991	
SK 1436		Romanian Orthodox Church of St. Nicholas	Vršac	Ritiševo Pionirska St. nn	5 March 1958	30 December 1991	
SK 1437		Church of the Ascension of Christ	Vršac	Potporanj Maršala Tita St. no. 2	15 April 1983	30 December 1991	
SK 1438		Vlajkovac Castle	Vršac	Vlajkovac Vršačka St. no. 58-60	25 April 1989	30 December 1991	
SK 1439		Vršac Town Hall	Vršac	Vršac Pobede Square no. 1	22 June 1970	30 December 1991	
SK 1440		"Kod dva pištolja" (At Two Pistols')	Vršac	Vršac Crvene armija Square (Sv. Teodora Vršačkog Square) no. 5	28 April 1948	30 December 1991	
SK 1441		Former City National Committee Building	Vršac	Vršac Pobede Square no. 1	28 April 1948	30 December 1991	
SK 1442		"Anđa Ranković" Nursery Building	Vršac	Vršac Pašićev Square no. 2	22 June 1970	30 December 1991	
SK 1443		Building at Pobede Square no. 5	Vršac	Vršac Pobede Square no. 5	24 June 1970	30 December 1991	
SK 1444		Building at Žarka Zrenjanina Street No. 21	Vršac	Vršac Žarka Zrenjanina St. no. 21	24 June 1970	30 December 1991	
SK 1445		Konkordija Building	Vršac	Vršac Žarka Zrenjanina St. no. 20	24 June 1970	30 December 1991	
SK 1446		Romanian Orthodox Church of the Ascension of Christ	Bela Crkva	Grebenac	14 March 1975 (iconostasis and icons) 9 April 1975 (whole building)	30 December 1991	
SK 1447		St. Nicholas' Church in Opovo	Opovo	Opovo JNA St. no. 43	11 November 1971	30 December 1991	
SK 1448		St. Nicholas' Church in Sakule	Opovo	Sakule Maršala Tita St. no. 17	28 September 1966	30 December 1991	
SK 1453		Church in Kovilje	Ivanjica	Kovilje	11 February 1964	5 December 1987	
SK 1458		Holy Transfiguration Church	Alibunar	Dobrica Svetog Save St. no. 64	26 August 1950	30 December 1991	
SK 1459		Old Watermill of Kusić	Bela Crkva	Kusić	13 February 1975	30 December 1991	The watermill does not exist any more, it has been demolished.
SK 1460		St. Nicholas' Church	Kovačica	Samoš JNA St. no. 30	15 June 1974	30 December 1991	
SK 1461		Church of the Dormition of the Virgin	Kovačica	Crepaja Oslobođenja Square no. 9	15 March 1950	30 December 1991	
SK 1462		Church of the Translation of the Relics of St. Nicholas	Kovin	Deliblato	17 August 1950 (icons) 14 June 1963 (expansion)	30 December 1991	
SK 1464		Church of the Holy Archangels	Kovin	Kovin Vuka Karadžića St. no. 70	16 April 1969	30 December 1991	
SK 1465		Lighthouses at the confluence of the Tamiš River and the Danube	Pančevo	Pančevo	9 November 1972	30 December 1991	
SK 1466		Birth House of Žarko Zrenjanin	Vršac	Izbište Žarka Zrenjanina St. no. 38	24 June 1970	30 December 1991	
SK 1467		Bela Crkva Fire Station	Bela Crkva	Bela Crkva: 1. Oktobra St. no. 10	12 December 1991	30 December 1991	
SK 1899		Roman Catholic Church of St. Joseph	Beočin	Čerević Kralja Petra Prvog St. no. 10	8 November 1966 (three paintings) 17 February 2000 (whole building)	30 December 1991	
SK 333		Old District Offices Building – University Building	Niš / Crveni Krst	Niš Kej Mike Paligorića no. 2	9 May 1972	7 April 1979	
SK 311		Pasteur Institute Building	Niš / Medijana	Niš Bulevar Dr. Zorana Djindjića no. 50	24 December 1975	7 April 1979	
SK 540		Old Church of the Dormition of the Virgin at the Smederevo Cemetery	Smederevo	Smederevo	27 August 1947	7 April 1979	
SK 545		District Courthouse	Smederevo	Smederevo Republike Square no. 2	14 May 1981	21 July 1983	
SK 547		Mladenović's family Old Road Tavern	Smederevo	Saraorci	14 May 1981	21 July 1983	
SK 612		Wooden Church of the Holy Trinity	Smederevska Palanka	Selevac	4 February 1983	5 December 1987	
SK 544		Koporin Monastery	Velika Plana	Velika Plana	26 March 1951	7 April 1979	
SK 550		Wooden Church	Smederevska Palanka	Smederevska Palanka	20 December 1948	21 July 1983	
SK 549		Wooden Church	Velika Plana	Krnjevo	20 December 1948	21 July 1983	
SK 606		Alexander's Sap	Despotovac	Senjski Rudnik	24 February 1975	7 April 1979	
SK 273		Namasija Monastery Complex	Paraćin	Zabrega	30 June 1975	21 July 1983 (cluster "Group of Churches and Sites in the Crnica River Valley")	
SK 274		Church of St. Mary Magdalene of Petrus	Paraćin	Popovac	30 June 1975	21 July 1983 (cluster "Group of Churches and Sites in the Crnica River Valley")	
SK 275		Church of St. John the Beheaded	Paraćin	Zabrega	30 June 1975	21 July 1983 (cluster "Group of Churches and Sites in the Crnica River Valley")	
SK 154		Monastery of the Holy Mother of God	Paraćin	Lešje	30 June 1975	21 July 1983 (cluster "Group of Churches and Sites in the Crnica River Valley")	
SK 259		St. Parascheva Monastery	Paraćin	Izvor	8 May 1972	21 July 1983 (cluster "Group of Churches and Sites in the Crnica River Valley")	
SK 773		Church of the Holy Virgin	Vladičin Han	Mrtvica	30 May 1986	5 December 1987	
SK 659		Markovo Kale Medieval Fortress	Vranje	Vranje	29 June 1948	21 July 1983	
SK 863		Municipal Authorities Building (Vranje Municipal Assembly)	Vranje	Vranje Republike Square	30 June 1986	5 December 1987	
SK 408		Milentija Monastery	Brus	Osredci	24 June 1975	21 July 1983	
SK 404		Church of St. Peter and Paul (Memorial Complex)	Brus	Kriva Reka	25 June 1975	7 April 1979	Complex includes the Church and the tombs of partisans executed in 1942.
SK 232		St. Roman Monastery	Ražanj	Praskovče	31 May 1967	21 July 1983 (cluster "Churches and Monasteries of Mojsinje")	
SK 1063		Church of the Holy Spirit	Ćićevac	Stalać	16 December 1992	21 July 1983 (cluster "Churches and Monasteries of Mojsinje")	
SK 903		Church of The Holy Archangels	Ćićevac	Stalać	29 March 1985	21 July 1983 (cluster "Churches and Monasteries of Mojsinje")	
SK 512		St. John's Church	Ćićevac	Stevanac	30 May 1974	21 July 1983 (cluster "Churches and Monasteries of Mojsinje")	
SK 513		St. Mark's Church	Ćićevac	Jakovac	29 May 1974	21 July 1983 (cluster "Churches and Monasteries of Mojsinje")	
SK 975		St. Nicholas' Church	Ćićevac	Braljina	7 October 1992	21 July 1983 (cluster "Churches and Monasteries of Mojsinje")	
SK 517		Simić House	Kruševac	Kruševac Zakićeva St. no. 4 (Majke Jugovića St. no 2)	26 May 1976	21 July 1983	
SK 394		District Authorities Building	Kruševac	Kruševac Pana Đukića St. no. 1	12 May 1970	7 April 1979	
SK 485		Katić House	Trstenik	Trstenik Cara Lazara St. no. 1	10 March 1950	7 April 1979	
SK 516		Seničić House	Kraljevo	Pečenog	14 August 1975	21 July 1983	
SK 397		"Četvrti Kraljevački bataljon" Primary School Building (Museum Building)	Kraljevo	Kraljevo Vojvode Stepe St. no. 1	1 June 1971	7 April 1979	
SK 482		Residence of Gospodar Vasa	Kraljevo	Kraljevo Karađorđeva St. no. 1	2 March 1950	7 April 1979	
SK 169		St. Nicholas' Church in Ušće	Kraljevo	Ušće	25 January 1985	21 July 1983 (cluster "Group of Churches near the Studenica Monastery")	
SK 178		Church of St. George in Vrh	Kraljevo	Vrh	17 August 1948	21 July 1983 (cluster "Group of Churches near the Studenica Monastery")	
SK 179		Church of the Holy Mother of God in Dolac	Kraljevo	Dolac	17 August 1948	21 July 1983 (cluster "Group of Churches near the Studenica Monastery")	
SK 180		Church of St. Nicholas in Reka	Kraljevo	Reka Palež	17 August 1948	21 July 1983 (cluster "Group of Churches near the Studenica Monastery")	
SK 1083		St. Alexius' Church in Miliće	Kraljevo	Miliće	7 May 1993	21 July 1983 (cluster "Group of Churches near the Studenica Monastery")	
SK 667		Upper Hermitage of St. Sava	Kraljevo	Savovo	31 May 1983	21 July 1983 (cluster "Group of Churches near the Studenica Monastery")	
SK 668		Lower Hermitage of St. Sava	Kraljevo	Savovo	31 May 1983	21 July 1983 (cluster "Group of Churches near the Studenica Monastery")	
—		Church of St. Demetrius, Željeznica	Kraljevo	Željeznica	—	21 July 1983 (cluster "Group of Churches near the Studenica Monastery")	Church of St. Demetrius in Željeznica was classified as a Cultural Monument of Great Importance by the National Assembly as part of the cluster "Group of Churches near the Studenica Monastery", although it was never proclaimed a Cultural Heritage at the first place. Thus, it is not inscribed into the Central Register.
SK 1077		Church of St. Catherine in Kosurići	Kraljevo	Tadenje Kosurići	10 May 1993	21 July 1983 (cluster "Group of Churches near the Studenica Monastery")	
SK 379		Church of St. Demetrius in Janačko Polje	Novi Pazar	Janča Janačko Polje	4 November 1963	21 July 1983 (cluster "Group of Churches near the Sopoćani Monastery")	
SK 386		Church of St. Nicholas in Štitare	Novi Pazar	Štitare	11 April 1970	21 July 1983 (cluster "Group of Churches near the Sopoćani Monastery")	
SK 387		Church of St. Mary – Marinica	Novi Pazar	Dojinoviće	11 April 1970	21 July 1983 (cluster "Group of Churches near the Sopoćani Monastery")	
SK 388		Church of St. Peter and Paul in Pope	Novi Pazar	Pope	11 April 1970	21 July 1983 (cluster "Group of Churches near the Sopoćani Monastery")	
SK 1081		Lazarica Church in Purće	Novi Pazar	Pope Purće	11 April 1970	21 July 1983 (cluster "Group of Churches near the Sopoćani Monastery")	
SK 393		Church of St. Lazarus in Živalići	Novi Pazar	Živalići	30 January 1948	21 July 1983 (cluster "Group of Churches near the Sopoćani Monastery")	
SK 390		Old Hammam of Novi Pazar	Novi Pazar	Novi Pazar: 7. Jula St. no. 24	16 April 1970	7 April 1979	
SK 501		Končulić Monastery (Church of St. Nicholas)	Raška	Končulić	14 April 1970	21 July 1983	
SK 500		Church of St. Nicholas	Raška	Baljevac	14 April 1970	5 December 1987	
SK 395		Church of St. Nicholas	Raška	Šumnik	12 May 1970	5 December 1987	
SK 369		Church of St. Peter and Paul	Tutin	Tutin Lukavica	4 March 1950	21 July 1983	
SK 385		Belimarković Castle	Vrnjačka Banja	Vrnjačka Banja	12 March 1970	21 July 1983	
SK 1239		Roman Catholic Church in Bajša	Bačka Topola	Bajša	11 April 1973	30 December 1991	
SK 1240		Serbian Orthodox Church of St. Demetrius	Bačka Topola	Bajša Zakina St. no. 3	2 December 1969	30 December 1991	
SK 1091		Zako Castle	Bačka Topola	Bajša	10 April 1973	30 December 1991	
SK 1455		Panonian Type Farmhouse with Household	Bačka Topola	Bačka Topola Moše Pijade St. (Svetosavska St.) no. 19	24 October 1984	30 December 1991	
SK 1126		Serbian Orthodox Church of St. Demetrius	Subotica	Aleksandrovo	24 August 1950	30 December 1991	
SK 1215		Franciscan Cloister	Subotica	Subotica Cara Jovana Nenada Square no. 13	31 March 1951	30 December 1991	
SK 1216		Roman Catholic Cathedral of Teresa of Ávila	Subotica	Subotica Žrtava Fašizma Square no. 19	19 March 1973	30 December 1991	
SK 1217		St. Roch's Chapel	Subotica	Subotica Matka Vukovića St. nn	21 November 1960	30 December 1991	
SK 1218		Raichle Palace	Subotica	Subotica Lenjinski Park	5 March 1973	30 December 1991	
SK 1219		Town Library Building	Subotica	Subotica Cara Dušana St. no. 2	30 December 1981	30 December 1991	
SK 1220		National Teatre Building	Subotica	Subotica Borisa Kidriča St. no. 2	30 December 1986	30 December 1991	
SK 1221		Trošarina Building	Subotica	Subotica JNA St. nn	30 December 1981	30 December 1991	
SK 1223		Manojlović Palace	Subotica	Subotica Borisa Kidriča St. no. 8	30 December 1986	30 December 1991	
SK 1224		Đorđe Manojlović family House	Subotica	Subotica Borisa Kidriča St. no. 12	30 December 1986	30 December 1991	
SK 1225		Ostojić Palace	Subotica	Subotica Republike Square no. 46	31 December 1986	30 December 1991	
SK 1226		Yellow House	Subotica	Subotica Štrosmajerova St. no. 11	9 April 1985	30 December 1991	
SK 1227		Tomb of Gaál Ferenc at Bajsko Cemetery	Subotica	Subotica	21 March 1985	30 December 1991	
SK 1228		Tomb of István Iványi at Bajsko Cemetery	Subotica	Subotica	9 July 1982	30 December 1991	
SK 1836		Aksentije Marodić House	Subotica	Subotica Vatroslava Lisinskog St. no. 9	12 September 1950	30 December 1991	
SK 1236		Elementary School in Ada Area	Ada	near Gornji Breg VI reon no. 114	10 December 1990	30 December 1991	
SK 1241		Serbian Orthodox Church of the Ascension of Christ	Ada	Ada	13 July 1949	30 December 1991	
SK 1145		Novak Radonjić's Birth House	Ada	Mol	30 April 1948	30 December 1991	
SK 1084		Serbian Orthodox Church	Ada	Mol	26 June 1974	30 December 1991	
SK 1136		Serbian Orthodox Church	Čoka	Sanad	12 November 1971	30 December 1991	
SK 1244		Serbian Orthodox Church in Čoka	Čoka	Čoka	12 November 1971	30 December 1991	
SK 1237		Castle of Earl Karas	Kanjiža	Horgoš	1 August 1952	30 December 1991	
SK 1105		Vodica Chapel	Kikinda	Kikinda Put za Vodice St. no. 9	15 December 1978	30 December 1991	
SK 1106		District of Velika Kikinda Building ("Kurija")	Kikinda	Kikinda Srpskih dobrovoljaca Square no. 21	4 September 1948	30 December 1991	
SK 1454		Church of the Holy Archangels Michael and Gabriel	Kikinda	Iđoš Nikole Francuskog St. no. 2	13 November 1967	30 December 1991	
SK 1259		Čarnojević family Tomb	Kikinda	Rusko Selo	14 November 1975	30 December 1991	
SK 1142		National Committee Former Building	Kikinda	Bašaid Vojvođanska St. no. 56	6 September 1968	30 December 1991	
SK 1143		National Committee Former Building	Novi Kneževac	Srpski Krstur	4 April 1972	30 December 1991	
SK 1108		Servijski family Castle (Šulpe Castle)	Novi Kneževac	Novi Kneževac	9 July 1952	30 December 1991	
SK 1242		Serbian Orthodox Church of the Holy Archangels Michael and Gabriel	Novi Kneževac	Novi Kneževac	4 April 1973	30 December 1991	
SK 1243		Oil Processing Drive in Obilićevo	Novi Kneževac	Novi Kneževac Obilićevo	30 March 1966	30 December 1991	
SK 1229		Serbian Orthodox Church of St. Michael	Senta	Senta	31 December 1948 (iconostasis) 17 December 1970 (whole building)	30 December 1991	
SK 1230		Senta Town Hall	Senta	Senta Maršala Tita Square no. 1	16 April 1985	30 December 1991	
SK 1231		Firefighters' Barracks in Senta	Senta	Senta Petra Drapšina St. no. 12	14 May 1975	30 December 1991	
SK 1232		Presbytery Building (Senta Museum)	Senta	Senta Maršala Tita Square no. 5	16 April 1985	30 December 1991	
SK 1233		Royal Hotel	Senta	Senta J. Đorđevića St. no. 11	16 April 1985	30 December 1991	
SK 1234		Slavnić House	Senta	Senta Lenjinova St no. 10	16 April 1985	30 December 1991	
SK 1235		Stevan Sremac Birth House	Senta	Senta Stevana Sremca St. no. 4	27 December 1948	30 December 1991	
SK 1123		Đura Jakšić Birth House	Nova Crnja	Srpska Crnja Kralja Aleksandra St. no. 62	30 April 1948	30 December 1991	
SK 1204		Serbian Orthodox Church in Srpska Crnja	Nova Crnja	Srpska Crnja Kralja Aleksandra St. no. 81	16 August 1948 (iconostasis) 13 April 1989 (whole building)	30 December 1991	
SK 1130		St. Gabriel's Serbian Orthodox Church	Novi Bečej	Bočar Petefi Šandora St. no. 2	12 November 1971 (iconostasis) 18 September 1985 (whole building)	30 December 1991	
SK 1185		Serbian Orthodox Church (Dragutinovo village)	Novi Bečej	Novo Miloševo Popov Arkadija St.	19 February 1958	30 December 1991	
SK 1457		Karácsonyi Castle	Novi Bečej	Novo Miloševo Maršala Tita St. no. 105	12 September 1968	30 December 1991	
SK 1107		Serbian Orthodox Church in Kumane	Novi Bečej	Kumane Ljubice Odadžić St.	6 April 1983	30 December 1991	
SK 1180		Manastir Chapel	Novi Bečej	Novi Bečej Zmaj Jovina St.	23 May 1963	30 December 1991	
SK 1181		St. Nicholas' Church	Novi Bečej	Novi Bečej Petra Drapšina St. no. 4	6 October 1966	30 December 1991	
SK 1182		St. John The Baptist's Church in Vranjevo	Novi Bečej	Novi Bečej Josifa Marinkovića St. no. 61	7 October 1966 (iconostasis) 1 April 1968 (whole building)	30 December 1991	
SK 1183		Residential Building in Novi Bečej (Glavaš House)	Novi Bečej	Novi Bečej Josifa Marinkovića St. no. 69	1 April 1968	30 December 1991	
SK 1184		Municipal Authorities Building in Vranjevo	Novi Bečej	Novi Bečej Rajka Rakočevića St. no. 15	1 April 1968	30 December 1991	
SK 1133		Serbian Orthodox Church of St. Nicholas	Sečanj	Jaša Tomić Maršala Tita St.	10 December 1948	30 December 1991	
SK 1195		Serbian Orthodox Church of the Ascension	Sečanj	Šurjan Maršala Tita St.	21 November 1949	30 December 1991	
SK 1115		Konak Castle	Sečanj	Konak Maršala Tita St. no. 14	20 January 1984	30 December 1991	
SK 1194		Serbian Orthodox Church in Jarkovac	Sečanj	Jarkovac Mihajla Pupina St.	29 December 1949	30 December 1991	
SK 1208		Serbian Orthodox Church of St. Sava and St. Simeon	Žitište	Srpski Itebej Slobode Square	1 April 1968	30 December 1991	
SK 1100		Iconostasis of the Serbian Orthodox Church	Žitište	Međa Mladena Stojanovića St.	28 December 1948	30 December 1991	
SK 1104		Windmill of Melenci	Zrenjanin	Melenci Nadostrvo	6 February 1965	30 December 1991	
SK 1198		Serbian Orthodox Church of St. Nicholas	Zrenjanin	Melenci Srpskih vladara St.	9 November 1966	30 December 1991	
SK 1201		Birth House of the People's Hero Toza Marković	Zrenjanin	Taraš Maršala Tita St. no. 46	29 December 1949	30 December 1991	
SK 1203		St. George's Serbian Orthodox Church	Zrenjanin	Čenta Čarnojevićeva St.	14 May 1974	30 December 1991	
SK 1199		Serbian Orthodox Church of the Presentation of the Virgin	Zrenjanin	Orlovat Uroša Predića Square	28 June 1979	30 December 1991	
SK 1101		Old Serbian Orthodox Church ("Namastir")	Zrenjanin	Botoš Đurišić Stevana St.	3 March 1972	30 December 1991	
SK 1202		Serbian Orthodox Church in Tomaševac	Zrenjanin	Tomaševac Maršala Tita St.	19 December 1950	30 December 1991	
SK 1103		Romanian Orthodox Church Iconostasis and the Thrones	Zrenjanin	Ečka Maršala Tita St.	14 March 1973	30 December 1991	
SK 1102		Serbian Orthodox Church	Zrenjanin	Ečka Beogradska St.	21 February 1948	30 December 1991	
SK 1200		Serbian Orthodox Church in Stajićevo	Zrenjanin	Stajićevo Milanka Đorđevića St. no. 29	31 March 1966	30 December 1991	
SK 1179		Church of The Presentation of The Virgin in Gradnulica	Zrenjanin	Zrenjanin Cara Dušana St.	4 August 1961	30 December 1991	
SK 1146		Sandić House	Zrenjanin	Zrenjanin Karađorđev Square no. 21	16 October 1964	30 December 1991	The house is in extremely bad condition.
SK 1178		Church of the Dormition of The Virgin	Zrenjanin	Zrenjanin Svetosavska St. no. 2	2 August 1961 (iconostasis) 14 March 1968 (whole building)	30 December 1991	
SK 1153		Upper and Lower Fortress Remains	Inđija	Stari Slankamen	16 August 1948	30 December 1991	
SK 1140		Military Frontier Building	Inđija	Krčedin Maršala Tita St.	23 March 1971	30 December 1991	
SK 1282		Serbian Orthodox Church of St. Nicholas	Inđija	Krčedin	23 June 1972	30 December 1991	
SK 1284		St. Sava's Serbian Orthodox Church	Inđija	Maradik	29 July 1980	30 December 1991	
SK 1285		Roman Catholic Church of St. Michael	Inđija	Novi Slankamen	13 October 1977	30 December 1991	
SK 1286		Đorđe Natošević House	Inđija	Stari Slankamen Đorđa Natoševića St. no. 18	18 June 1976	30 December 1991	
SK 1288		Serbian Orthodox Church of St. Nicholas	Inđija	Čortanovci	16 July 1975	30 December 1991	
SK 1132		Serbian Orthodox Church of St. Nicholas	Irig	Irig	26 December 1949	30 December 1991	
SK 1289		Vrdnik Tower	Irig	Vrdnik	15 March 1949	30 December 1991	
SK 1290		Serbian Orthodox Church of St. John the Baptist	Irig	Vrdnik	10 March 1978	30 December 1991	
SK 1291		House where Milica Stojadinović Srpkinja lived	Irig	Vrdnik Ravanička St. no. 33	30 December 1950	30 December 1991	
SK 1292		Vrdnik Power Plant	Irig	Vrdnik	16 June 1976	30 December 1991	Partially damaged during the 1999 NATO bombing of Yugoslavia. Completely demolished by the local authorities in 1999–2000.
SK 1293		Serbian Orthodox Church of the Dormition of the Virgin	Irig	Irig	31 December 1954	30 December 1991	
SK 1294		Serbian Orthodox Church of St. Nicholas	Irig	Jazak	8 November 1966	30 December 1991	
SK 1295		Serbian Orthodox Church of St. Theodore Tyron	Irig	Irig	31 December 1954	30 December 1991	
SK 1296		St. Nicholas' Serbian Orthodox Church	Irig	Neradin	20 April 1976	30 December 1991	
SK 1297		Watermill of Rivica	Irig	Rivica	25 June 1965	30 December 1991	
SK 1298		Holy Transfiguration Church	Irig	Šatrinci	11 August 1976	30 December 1991	
SK 1260		Serbian Orthodox Church in Deč	Pećinci	Deč	17 May 1976	30 December 1991	
SK 1261		Granary with the Corn Crib	Pećinci	Ašanja Maršala Tita St. (Nenadovićeva St.) no. 16	3 June 1976	30 December 1991	
SK 1262		Serbian Orthodox Church of the Holy Archangels Michael and Gabriel	Pećinci	Brestač	16 July 1975	30 December 1991	
SK 1263		Serbian Orthodox Church of St. Nicholas	Pećinci	Karlovčić	22 December 1978	30 December 1991	
SK 1264		Kupinik Fortress	Pećinci	Kupinovo	14 May 1948	30 December 1991	
SK 1265		Serbian Orthodox Church of the Holy Spirit	Pećinci	Kupinovo	28 April 1980	30 December 1991	
SK 1266		Financial Barracks	Pećinci	Kupinovo Branka Madžarevića St. no. 60	4 January 1963	30 December 1991	
SK 1267		Granary with the Corn Crib in Kupinovo	Pećinci	Kupinovo Savska St. no. 15	30 December 1976	30 December 1991	
SK 1268		Granary with the Corn Crib in Kupinovo	Pećinci	Kupinovo Žike Maričića St. no. 17	4 June 1976	30 December 1991	
SK 1269		Holy Transfiguration Church	Pećinci	Obrež	10 October 1073	30 December 1991	
SK 1271		House in which Karađorđe stayed in 1787	Pećinci	Popinci Fruškogorska St. no. 21	24 July 1978	30 December 1991	
SK 1270		Serbian Orthodox Church of St. Nicholas	Pećinci	Popinci	26 September 1968	30 December 1991	
SK 1272		Serbian Orthodox Church of St. Nicholas	Pećinci	Prhovo	17 December 1976	30 December 1991	
SK 1273		Village house of Merima Jankov	Pećinci	Sibač Svetozara Miletića St. no. 13	30 August 1977	30 December 1991	This house does not exist any more. It was demolished in 1991.
SK 1274		Serbian Orthodox Church of St. John the Apostle	Pećinci	Sremski Mihaljevci	21 December 1976	30 December 1991	
SK 1275		Granary with the Corn Crib In Sremski Mihaljevci	Pećinci	Sremski Mihaljevci Prhovačka St. no. 54	25 May 1976	30 December 1991	
SK 1276		Serbian Orthodox Church of Nativity of St. John	Pećinci	Subotište	26 January 1977	30 December 1991	
SK 1277		St. Nicholas' Church, Šimanovci	Pećinci	Šimanovci	16 March 1967	30 December 1991	
SK 1278		Ilija Atanacković House	Pećinci	Šimanovci Maršala Tita St. no. 2	18 June 1981	30 December 1991	
SK 1283		St. Gabriel's Serbian Orthodox Church	Ruma	Buđanovci	24 May 1971	30 December 1991	
SK 1287		Granary with the Corn Crib In Buđanovci	Ruma	Buđanovci Nebojše Jerkovića St. no. 11	17 December 1976	30 December 1991	This monument does not exist any more, since it was burned down in a fire.
SK 1299		Serbian Orthodox Church in Voganj	Ruma	Voganj	10 July 1962	30 December 1991	
SK 1300		St. Nicholas' Serbian Orthodox Church	Ruma	Dobrinci	8 April 1967	30 December 1991	
SK 1301		St. Nicholas' Serbian Orthodox Church	Ruma	Donji Petrovci	20 May 1969	30 December 1991	
SK 1302		Donji Petrovci Watermill	Ruma	Donji Petrovci Građanska St. no. 43	6 February 1979	30 December 1991	This watermill does not exist any more. It collapsed and the remains were removed.
SK 1303		Serbian Orthodox Church of St. Nicholas	Ruma	Kraljevci	16 January 1984	30 December 1991	
SK 1304		St. Gabriel's Serbian Orthodox Church	Ruma	Platičevo: 29. Oktobra St. no. 4	31 December 1952	30 December 1991	
SK 1305		Serbian Orthodox Church of the Ascension of Christ	Ruma	Ruma	30 June 1967	30 December 1991	
SK 1306		St. Nicholas' Serbian Orthodox Church	Ruma	Ruma	24 June 1967	30 December 1991	
SK 1307		Serbian Orthodox Church of the Descent of the Holy Spirit	Ruma	Ruma	15 April 1969	30 December 1991	
SK 1308		Roman Catholic Church of the Ascension of the Holy Cross	Ruma	Ruma	13 April 1978	30 December 1991	
SK 1309		Museum Building in Ruma	Ruma	Ruma Glavna St. no. 182	28 June 1967	30 December 1991	
SK 1310		Fišer Salaš	Ruma	Ruma	23 August 1979	30 December 1991	
SK 1311		Serbian Orthodox Church of St. Nicholas	Ruma	Stejanovci	13 March 1967	30 December 1991	
SK 1312		Roman Catholic Church of St. Climent	Ruma	Hrtkovci Karađorđeva St. no. 1	22 December 1976	30 December 1991	
SK 1313		St. Gabriel's Serbian Orthodox Church	Sremska Mitrovica	Veliki Radinci	15 April 1949	30 December 1991	
SK 1314		St. Gabriel's Serbian Orthodox Church	Sremska Mitrovica	Grgurevci	5 February 1971	30 December 1991	
SK 1315		St. George's Serbian Orthodox Church	Sremska Mitrovica	Divoš	28 July 1980	30 December 1991	
SK 1316		Serbian Orthodox Church of the Holy Trinity	Sremska Mitrovica	Zasavica I	17 February 1978	30 December 1991	
SK 1317		St. George's Serbian Orthodox Church	Sremska Mitrovica	Jarak	12 June 1969	30 December 1991	
SK 1318		St. Cosmas and Damian's Serbian Orthodox Church	Sremska Mitrovica	Kuzmin	21 April 1967	30 December 1991	
SK 1319		Granary in Kuzmin	Sremska Mitrovica	Kuzmin Savska St. no. 94	3 August 1976	30 December 1991	
SK 1320		Granary in Kuzmin	Sremska Mitrovica	Kuzmin Zmaj Jovina St. no. 57	7 May 1976	30 December 1991	
SK 1321		St. Gabriel's Serbian Orthodox Church	Sremska Mitrovica	Laćarak	9 February 1949	30 December 1991	
SK 1322		Granary in Laćarak	Sremska Mitrovica	Laćarak Prvog Novembra St. no. 174	10 February 1981	30 December 1991	
SK 1323		St. George's Serbian Orthodox Church	Sremska Mitrovica	Ležimir	2 February 1979	30 December 1991	
SK 1324		House in Ležimir	Sremska Mitrovica	Ležimir Pinkijeva St. no. 27	4 November 1980	30 December 1991	
SK 1325		St. George's Serbian Orthodox Church	Sremska Mitrovica	Manđelos	8 December 1980	30 December 1991	
SK 1326		St. Nicholas' Serbian Orthodox Church	Sremska Mitrovica	Martinci	11 August 1967	30 December 1991	
SK 1327		Roman Catholic Church of St. Demetrius	Sremska Mitrovica	Sremska Mitrovica	7 April 1966	30 December 1991	
SK 1328		Old Hospital of Sremska Mitrovica	Sremska Mitrovica	Sremska Mitrovica Stari šor St. no. 65	19 July 1978	30 December 1991	
SK 1329		Building of the Institute for the Protection of Cultural Heritage	Sremska Mitrovica	Sremska Mitrovica Svetog Dimitrija St. no. 10	5 February 1954	30 December 1991	
SK 1330		Grain Storehouse on the Sava River – Vojarna (Barracs)	Sremska Mitrovica	Sremska Mitrovica Bulevar Konstantina Velikog	5 April 1966	30 December 1991	
SK 1331		Main Guard Building	Sremska Mitrovica	Sremska Mitrovica Vuka Karadžića St. no. 10	5 April 1966	30 December 1991	
SK 1332		House in Sremska Mitrovica	Sremska Mitrovica	Sremska Mitrovica Lenjinova St. (Bulevar Arsenija Čarnojevića) no. 51	7 April 1966	30 December 1991	
SK 1333		Ilarion Ruvarac's Birthhouse	Sremska Mitrovica	Sremska Mitrovica	2 June 1977	30 December 1991	
SK 1334		Serbian Orthodox Church of the Descent of the Holy Spirit	Sremska Mitrovica	Šašinci	3 April 1967	30 December 1991	
SK 1335		Serbian Orthodox Church of St. Nicholas	Sremska Mitrovica	Šuljam	1 February 1969	30 December 1991	
SK 1450		St. Demetrius' Church	Sremska Mitrovica	Sremska Mitrovica	4 April 1966	30 December 1991	Erroneously inscribed in the Central register as the "St. Stephen's Church in Sremska Mitrovica".
SK 1452		Internal Affairs Sector Building in Sremska Mitrovica	Sremska Mitrovica	Sremska Mitrovica Ćire Milekića Square (Braće Radića) no. 1	27 September 1976	30 December 1991	
SK 1336		House at Vojka	Stara Pazova	Vojka Maršala Tita St. no. 41	30 November 1973	30 December 1991	
SK 1337		Serbian Orthodox Church of the Presentation of the Virgin	Stara Pazova	Golubinci	18 October 1968	30 December 1991	
SK 1338		Šlos Castle	Stara Pazova	Golubinci	26 September 1951	30 December 1991	
SK 1339		Serbian Orthodox Church of the Annunciation	Stara Pazova	Krnješevci	10 January 1984	30 December 1991	
SK 1340		Roman Catholic Church of St. Mary	Stara Pazova	Novi Banovci	27 December 1978	30 December 1991	
SK 1341		House in Novi Banovci	Stara Pazova	Novi Banovci Maršala Tita St. no. 63	30 December 1976	30 December 1991	
SK 1342		Evangelical Church in Stara Pazova	Stara Pazova	Stara Pazova	15 March 1967	30 December 1991	
SK 1343		Building in Stara Pazova	Stara Pazova	Stara Pazova JNA St. (Svetosavska St.) no. 1	30 December 1980	30 December 1991	
SK 1344		Srem Hotel	Stara Pazova	Stara Pazova JNA St. (Svetosavska St.) no. 2	30 December 1980	30 December 1991	
SK 1345		Serbian Orthodox Church of St. Nicholas	Stara Pazova	Stari Banovci	5 January 1977	30 December 1991	
SK 1346		St. Nicholas' Serbian Orthodox Church	Šid	Bačinci	5 June 1967	30 December 1991	
SK 1347		Berkasovo Fortress	Šid	Berkasovo	30 September 1948	30 December 1991	
SK 1348		St. Peter and Paul's Serbian Orthodox Church	Šid	Berkasovo	19 December 1973	30 December 1991	
SK 1349		Granary in Gibarac	Šid	Gibarac Maršala Tita St. (Svetog Save St.) no. 7	24 December 1980	30 December 1991	
SK 1350		Granary in Gibarac	Šid	Gibarac Maršala Tita St. (Svetog Save St.) no. 42	25 November 1980	30 December 1991	
SK 1351		St. Nicholas' Serbian Orthodox Church	Šid	Erdevik	8 December 1977	30 December 1991	
SK 1352		Roman Catcholic Church of St. Michael	Šid	Erdevik	31 January 1979	30 December 1991	
SK 1353		Roman Catholic Church of the Holy Trinity	Šid	Kukujevci	18 January 1977	30 December 1991	
SK 1354		Village house in Ljuba	Šid	Ljuba JNA St. no. 5	5 October 1977	30 December 1991	
SK 1355		Morović Fortress	Šid	Morović	19 October 1948	30 December 1991	
SK 1356		Roman Catholic Church of St. Mary	Šid	Morović	5 February 1954	30 December 1991	
SK 1357		Serbian Orthodox Church of St. Nicholas	Šid	Šid	9 August 1968	30 December 1991	
SK 1358		Ruthenian Court	Šid	Šid	14 March 1967	30 December 1991	
SK 1359		Sava Šumanović House	Šid	Šid Save Šumanovića St. no. 4	15 May 1969	30 December 1991	
SK 1360		"Sava Šumanović" Art Gallery	Šid	Šid Svetog Save St. no. 7	7 September 1974	30 December 1991	
SK 1361		Vajat in Šid	Šid	Šid 27 Zmaj Jovina St.	23 June 1976	30 December 1991	It was demolished.
SK 1362		Roman Catholic Church of St. John of Nepomuk	Šid	Gibarac Svetog Save St. no. 7	26 December 1980	30 December 1991	
SK 1363		Serbian Orthodox Church of St. Demetrius	Šid	Ljuba	18 May 1967	30 December 1991	
SK 1364		Serbian Orthodox Church of Holy Virgin	Šid	Morović	26 February 1970	30 December 1991	
SK 1365		Roman Catholic Church of St. Katherine	Šid	Sot Moše Pijade St. no. 14	5 April 1986	30 December 1991	
SK 355		Borač Fortress	Knić	Borač	2 March 1971 (Old cemetery)	21 July 1983	The complex includes the Church of St. Archangels, the Fortress and the Old Cemetery. Only the Cemetery was previously designated Cultural Heritage, thus this complex is inscribed in the Central Register as "Old Cemetery".
SK 272		Amidža Konak	Kragujevac	Kragujevac Vuka Karadžića St. no. 3	28 October 1947	7 April 1979 (as cluster "Buildings from the Obrenović era")	
SK 360		Prince Mihailo's Residence	Kragujevac	Kragujevac	28 October 1947	7 April 1979 (as cluster "Buildings from the Obrenović era")	
SK 452		Old Church of Kragujevac	Kragujevac	Kragujevac	26 September 1958	7 April 1979 (as cluster "Buildings from the Obrenović era")	The Old Church and the Old Assembly building are inscribed in the Central Register as a single monument.
SK 452		Old Assembly Building	Kragujevac	Kragujevac	26 September 1958	7 April 1979	The Old Church and the Old Assembly building are inscribed in the Central Register as a single monument.
SK 581		Petkovica Church	Kragujevac	Stragari	18 December 1963	21 July 1983	
SK 229		Latin Church (Jug-Bogdan Church)	Prokuplje	Prokuplje	21 October 1963	21 July 1983 (as a single complex)	Hisar Fortress, Church of St. Procopius and Latin Church are inscribed in the Central Register as a single monument (SK 2052), although the Latin Church is also inscribed separately (as SK 229).
SK 2052		Church of St. Procopius	Prokuplje	Prokuplje	23 July 1980	21 July 1983 (as a single complex)	Hisar Fortress, Church of St. Procopius and Latin Church are inscribed in the Central Register as a single monument (SK 2052), although the Latin Church is also inscribed separately (as SK 229).
SK 2052		Hisar Fortress	Prokuplje	Prokuplje	23 July 1980	21 July 1983 (as a single complex)	Hisar Fortress, Church of St. Procopius and Latin Church are inscribed in the Central Register as a single monument (SK 2052), although the Latin Church is also inscribed separately (as SK 229).
SK 1147		House at M. Tita Street no. 158	Kula	Ruski Krstur Maršala Tita St. no. 158	14 June 1965	30 December 1991	
SK 1189		St. Mark's Serbian Orthodox Church	Kula	Kula Lenjinova St. no. 30	1 March 1989	30 December 1991	
SK 1190		St. Nicholas' Translation of Relics Ruthenian Greek Catholic Church	Kula	Ruski Krstur Maršala Tita St. no. 64b	18 June 1969	30 December 1991	
SK 1191		St. Nicholas' Church	Kula	Sivac Maršala Tita St. no. 138	23 January 1968	30 December 1991	
SK 1112		Serbian Orthodox Church of Deronje Iconostasis	Odžaci	Deronje Kralja Aleksandra St. no. 44	28 November 1973	30 December 1991	
SK 1135		Serbian Orthodox Church of Ratkovo	Odžaci	Ratkovo Cara Dušana St. no. 43	21 September 1950	30 December 1991	
SK 1205		Roman Catholic Church of St. Michael	Odžaci	Odžaci Knez Mihajlova St. no. 26a	2 July 1970	30 December 1991	
SK 1169		St. Michael's Roman Catholic Church	Sombor	Bački Breg Rade Končara St. no. 2	5 March 1975	30 December 1991	
SK 1170		St. Peter and Paul's Roman Catholic Church	Sombor	Bački Monoštor Ivana Gorana Kovačića St. no. 29	28 August 1974	30 December 1991	
SK 1171		Roman Catholic Church and Rectory of Sombor	Sombor	Sombor: 7. Jula Square (Cara Lazara Square) no. 2	12 May 1959	30 December 1991	
SK 1172		Bács-Bodrog County Building	Sombor	Sombor Cara Uroša Square no. 1	21 August 1947	30 December 1991	
SK 1173		National Theater Building in Sombor	Sombor	Sombor Koste Trifkovića Square no. 2	30 May 1986	30 December 1991	
SK 1175		St. George's Church	Sombor	Sombor Braće Mihajlović St. (Veljka Petrovića St.) no. 2	18 September 1950	30 December 1991	
SK 1176		Serbian Orthodox Church of the Presentation of the Virgin	Sombor	Stapar Karađorđev plac no. 99a	22 September 1950	30 December 1991	
SK 1177		Granary in Stapar	Sombor	Stapar Maršala Tita St. no. 139 (Karađorđev plac no. 145)	8 February 1952	30 December 1991	The Granary has been moved to Kulpin in 2006.
SK 1213		Old Post Office	Sombor	Sombor Ernesta Kiša St. no. 1	13 October 1966	30 December 1991	
SK 1245		Building at M. Tita Street no. 9	Sombor	Sombor Maršala Tita St. (Kralja Petra Prvog St.) no. 9	19 June 1969	30 December 1991	
SK 1246		Building at M. Tita Street no. 19	Sombor	Sombor Maršala Tita St. (Kralja Petra Prvog St.) no. 19	19 June 1969	30 December 1991	
SK 1247		Building at Venac Stepe Stepanovića Street no. 22	Sombor	Sombor Venac Stepe Stepanovića St. no. 22	19 June 1969	30 December 1991	
SK 1248		Building at M. Tita Street no. 2	Sombor	Sombor Maršala Tita St. (Kralja Petra Prvog St.) no. 2	19 June 1969	30 December 1991	
SK 1249		Building at M. Tita Street no. 8 in Sombor	Sombor	Sombor Maršala Tita St. (Kralja Petra Prvog St.) no. 8	19 June 1969	30 December 1991	
SK 1250		Building at M. Tita Street no. 10 in Sombor	Sombor	Sombor Maršala Tita St. (Kralja Petra Prvog St.) no. 10	19 June 1969	30 December 1991	
SK 1251		Gale House (Milan Konjović Gallery Building)	Sombor	Sombor Svetog Trojstva Square no. 1	19 June 1969	30 December 1991	
SK 1252		Grašalković Palace	Sombor	Sombor Svetog trojstva Square (Bratstva i jedinstva Square) no. 1	19 June 1969	30 December 1991	
SK 1256		Building at Oslobođenja Square no. 6	Sombor	Sombor Oslobođenja Square (Svetog Đorđa Square) no. 6	19 June 1969	30 December 1991	
SK 1258		Preparandija	Sombor	Sombor Corner of the Maršala Tita St. (Kralja Petra Prvog St.) and Venac Vojvode Putnika St. no. 30	19 June 1969	30 December 1991	
SK 1253		"Karlo Bjelicki" Library Building	Sombor	Sombor Cara Lazara Square (7. jula Square) no. 3	11 June 1948	30 December 1991	
SK 1254		Krušper Palace (Archives Building)	Sombor	Sombor Cara Lazara Square (7. jula Square) no. 5-7	11 June 1948	30 December 1991	
SK 1255		Lalošević Building	Sombor	Sombor Bratstva i jedinstva Square no. 3	11 June 1948	30 December 1991	
SK 1257		Sombor Town Hall	Sombor	Sombor Slobode Square no. 1	11 June 1948	30 December 1991	
SK 1456		Chapel of St. John of Nepomuk	Sombor	Sombor Cara Lazara Square no. 3	11 June 1948	30 December 1991	
SK 374		Church of St. Nicholas	Arilje	Brekovo	23 August 1951	21 July 1983	
SK 377		Rača Monastery	Bajina Bašta	Rača	8 February 1955	21 July 1983	
SK 492		Wooden Church	Nova Varoš	Radijevići	15 August 1951	7 April 1979	
SK 521		House of the People's Hero Petar Leković	Požega	Svračkovo	8 April 1978	7 April 1979	
SK 406		Church of St. George	Požega	Godovik	29 May 1974	21 July 1983	
SK 495		Church of St. Archangels	Priboj	Poblaće	31 March 1959	21 July 1983	
SK 671		Mažići Monastery	Priboj	Orahovica	28 December 1983	5 December 1987	
SK 409		Old Hydroelectric Power Plant on the Đetinja	Užice	Užice	28 November 1974	7 April 1979	
SK 373		Church of St. Mark	Užice	Užice Nikola Pašića St. no. 41	15 August 1951	5 December 1987	

=== Archaeological Sites of Great Importance ===
Number in the Central Register	Picture	Name	City/Municipality	Location	designated cultural heritage	Great importance since	Comment
AN 19		Gradac Cave	Batočina	Gradac	9 February 1953	7 April 1979	
AN 21		Risovača Cave	Aranđelovac	Aranđelovac	5 August 1954	21 July 1983	
AN 28		Blaškovina	Požega	Visibaba	9 September 1968	5 December 1987 (cluster "Visibaba Archeological Sites")	
AN 29		Vesovina and Krčevina	Požega	Visibaba	19 January 1971	5 December 1987 (cluster "Visibaba Archeological Sites")	
AN 30		Varošište	Požega	Visibaba	19 January 1971	5 December 1987 (cluster "Visibaba Archeological Sites")	
AN 31		Bolnica (Hospital)	Požega	Visibaba	19 January 1971	5 December 1987 (cluster "Visibaba Archeological Sites")	
AN 32		Savinac	Požega	Visibaba	19 January 1971	5 December 1987 (cluster "Visibaba Archeological Sites")	
AN 35		Kolovrat Roman Necropolis	Prijepolje	Prijepolje Kolovrat	24 November 1982	21 July 1983	
AN 37		Timacum Minus	Knjaževac	Ravna	15 November 1979	7 April 1979	
AN 41		Kale – Drengrad	Prokuplje	Bregovina	14 March 1950	5 December 1987	
AN 42		Large Čuka of Hum (Velika Humska čuka)	Niš / Crveni Krst	Hum	7 April 1950	7 April 1979	
AN 47		Kulina (Balajnac)	Merošina	Gradište	2 March 1964	21 July 1983	
AN 79		Remesiana	Bela Palanka	Bela Palanka	6 June 1986	5 December 1987	
AN 85		Petrus Medieval Fortress	Paraćin	Zabrega	14 March 1985	21 July 1983	Proclaimed Monument of culture of great importance as part of the cluster "Group of Churches and Sites in the Crnica River Valley". Later reclasified as an archeological site.
AN 102		Lederata	Veliko Gradište	Ram	30 June 1986	5 December 1987	
AN 110		Turski Šanac	Bačka Palanka	Bačka Palanka	18 September 1968	30 December 1991	
AN 111		Gradina	Beočin	Rakovac	10 April 1969	30 December 1991	
AN 112		Kalakača	Inđija	Beška	11 June 1974	30 December 1991	
AN 113		Čarnok	Vrbas	Vrbas	2 September 1960	30 December 1991	
AN 114		Castellum Onagrinum	Novi Sad	Begeč	6 August 1970	30 December 1991	
AN 115		Mound near Vrcalova vodenica	Ruma	Ruma	25 December 1984	30 December 1991	
AN 116		Gradište	Kikinda	Iđoš	30 December 1950	30 December 1991	
AN 117		Grad	Bela Crkva	Dupljaja	10 March 1950	30 December 1991	
AN 118		Mihaljevačka šuma	Inđija	Čortanovci	9 June 1962	30 December 1991	
—		Acumincum	Inđija	Stari Slankamen	—	30 December 1991	Acumincum was classified as an Archaeological site of Great Importance separately from the Monument of Culture of Great Importance "Upper and Lower Fortress Remains" (SK 1153). However, in the Central Register, it is not inscribed separately as an archaeological site.
AN 119		Crkvine	Kanjiža	Horgoš	3 November 1970	30 December 1991	
AN 120		Matejski Brod	Novi Bečej	Novi Bečej	30 December 1950	30 December 1991	
AN 121		Remains of St. Grgur Monastery	Sremska Mitrovica	Grgurevci	5 February 1974	30 December 1991	
AN 122		Gradina Vašica on Bosut	Šid	Vašica	3 April 1967	30 December 1991	
AN 190		Pereš	Subotica	Hajdukovo	17 July 1950	30 December 1991	

=== Historic Landmarks of Great Importance ===
Number in the Central Register	Picture	Name	City/Municipality	Location address	designated cultural heritage	Great importance since	Comment
ZM 1		Monument and the Cemetery of The Liberators of Belgrade in Karađorđe's Park	Belgrade / Vračar	Belgrade Karađorđev Park	7 June 1965	7 April 1979	
ZM 2		Bojčin Forest	Belgrade / Surčin	Progar	30 June 1964	7 April 1979	
ZM 5		Moats at Ivankovac	Ćuprija	Ivankovac	8 March 1950	7 April 1979	
ZM 8		First Serbian Uprising Moats	Aleksinac	Deligrad	27 October 1949	7 April 1979	
ZM 20		Memorial Complex "Slobodište"	Kruševac	Kruševac	19 June 1991	21 July 1983	
ZM 22		"Čačalica" Memorial Park	Požarevac	Požarevac	5 November 1973	7 April 1979	
ZM 29		Former Fascist Prison ("Hotel Milo")	Bečej	Bečej Glavna St. (Maršala Tita St.) no. 90	28 July 1977	30 December 1991	
ZM 30		Monument at the Novi Sad Quai (Memorial to the Victims of the Novi Sad Raid)	Novi Sad	Novi Sad Kej žrtava racije	5 July 1988	30 December 1991	
ZM 31		Branko Radičević's Grave	Sremski Karlovci	Stražilovo hill	31 December 1948	30 December 1991	
ZM 32		Partisan Base "Centar"	Vrbas	Vrbas Milivoja Čobanskog St. no. 126	25 February 1977	30 December 1991	
ZM 33		Former Camp Building in Zrenjanin	Zrenjanin	Zrenjanin Cara Dušana St. no. 149	21 February 1989	30 December 1991	
ZM 34		Crna ćuprija (Black Bridge)	Žabalj	Žabalj	8 March 1977	30 December 1991	
ZM 35		Batina Battlefield (on the Danube River shore near Bezdan)	Sombor	Bezdan	5 January 1975	30 December 1991	
ZM 36		Leget Field Memorial	Sremska Mitrovica	Šašinci	14 October 1974	30 December 1991	
3M 37		Memorial Cemetery	Sremska Mitrovica	Sremska Mitrovica	28 April 1977	30 December 1991	
ZM 38		Filip Višnjić Tombstone	Šid	Višnjićevo	24 March 1977	30 December 1991	
ZM 40		Brankovina	Valjevo	Brankovina	8 July 1991	7 April 1979	

=== Spatial Cultural-Historical Units of Great Importance ===
Number in the Central Register	Picture	Name	City/Municipality	Location address	designated cultural heritage	Great importance since	Comment
PKIC 2		Grocka Bazaar	Belgrade / Grocka	Grocka Bulevar oslobođenja St.	12 May 1966	7 April 1979	
PKIC 3		Old Downtown of Zemun	Belgrade / Zemun	Zemun	1 November 1966	7 April 1979	
PKIC 6		Kosančićev venac	Belgrade / Stari Grad	Beograd	24 May 1971	7 April 1979	From Savski Bridge to the corner of the streets Karađorđeva and Pariska, Pariska St., Gračanička St., Ivan-Brgova St., Pop Lukina St., to Savski most
PKIC 8		Grčki šor (Greek Street)	Kruševac	Kruševac Vuka Karadžića St.	5 July 1967	7 April 1979	
PKIC 9		Lukarevina Field	Aleksandrovac	Drenča	22 October 1982	21 July 1983	
PKIC 12		Old downtown of Negotin	Negotin	Negotin	3 July 1980	21 July 1983	
PKIC 15		Urban Ensembles of Kragujevac	Kragujevac	Kragujevac	16 June 1970	7 April 1979	
PKIC 19		Village Godovik Narrow Area	Požega	Godovik	28 April 1981	21 July 1983	
PKIC 20		Part of the Ivanjica Town Center	Ivanjica	Ivanjica	8 July 1983	5 December 1987	
PKIC 21		Čajka's Hill	Vrnjačka Banja	Vrnjačka Banja	30 May 1985	5 December 1987	
PKIC 27		Part of Bistrica Village	Petrovac	Bistrica	4 June 1986	5 December 1987	
PKIC 33		Baba Zlatina Street Complex	Vranje	Vranje Baba Zlatina St.	30 June 1986	5 December 1987	
PKIC 41		Petrovaradin Upper and Lower Fortress with Suburb	Novi Sad / Petrovaradin	Petrovaradin	19 February 1946	28 October 1991	
PKIC 42		"Jodna banja" ("Iodine Spa") complex	Novi Sad	Novi Sad Bulevar revolucije St. no. 14	30 July 1986	28 October 1991	
PKIC 43		Old Cemeteries of Novi Sad	Novi Sad	Novi Sad	7 November 1973	28 October 1991	Includes: Uspensko, Almaško (pictured), Jewish and Catholic cemeteries in Novi Sad.
PKIC 44		Marcibanji-Karačonji Castle and Park	Novi Sad / Petrovaradin	Sremska Kamenica Dvor St. no. 1	22 February 1974	28 October 1991	
PKIC 45		Synagogue, Jewish School and Jewish Municipal Authorities Building	Novi Sad	Novi Sad Jevrejska St. no. 9-11	16 May 1983	28 October 1991	
PKIC 46		Memorial Cemetery of the Fighters in the People's Liberation War	Novi Sad	Novi Sad	28 January 1985	28 October 1991	
PKIC 48		Old Downtown of Zrenjanin	Zrenjanin	Zrenjanin	15 October 1968	28 October 1991	
PKIC 50		Old Downtown of Banatsko Novo Selo	Pančevo	Banatsko Novo Selo	12 January 1973	28 October 1991	
PKIC 51		Old Downtown of Bečej – Pogača Square	Bečej	Bečej	2 February 1976	28 October 1991	
PKIC 53		Town Ensemble of Subotica	Subotica	Subotica	31 December 1986	28 October 1991	
PKIC 54		Ethno-Park in Kupinovo	Pećinci	Kupinovo B. Markovića St. no. 140, 142, 138, 136, 146, 134, 148, 150, 127	9 February 1977	28 October 1991	
PKIC 55		Žitna pijaca Square (Bratstva i jedinstva)	Sremska Mitrovica	Sremska Mitrovica Žitna pijaca Square	9 April 1966	28 October 1991	
PKIC 56		Svetog Stefana Square (Narodnih Heroja)	Sremska Mitrovica	Sremska Mitrovica Svetog Stefana Square	4 April 1966	28 October 1991	
PKIC 57		Town Ensemble of Irig	Irig	Irig	19 February 1974	28 October 1991	
PKIC 58		Old Downtown of Pančevo	Pančevo	Pančevo	2 April 1973	28 October 1991	
PKIC 60		Old Downtown of Sombor "Venac"	Sombor	Sombor	19 June 1969	28 October 1991	

== See also ==
- Cultural Heritage of Serbia
- List of World Heritage Sites in Serbia
- List of fortifications in Serbia
- List of protected natural resources in Serbia
