= Mihajlović Family House =

Coordinates: 44°39′19″N 20°12′21″E

Mihajlović`s Family House
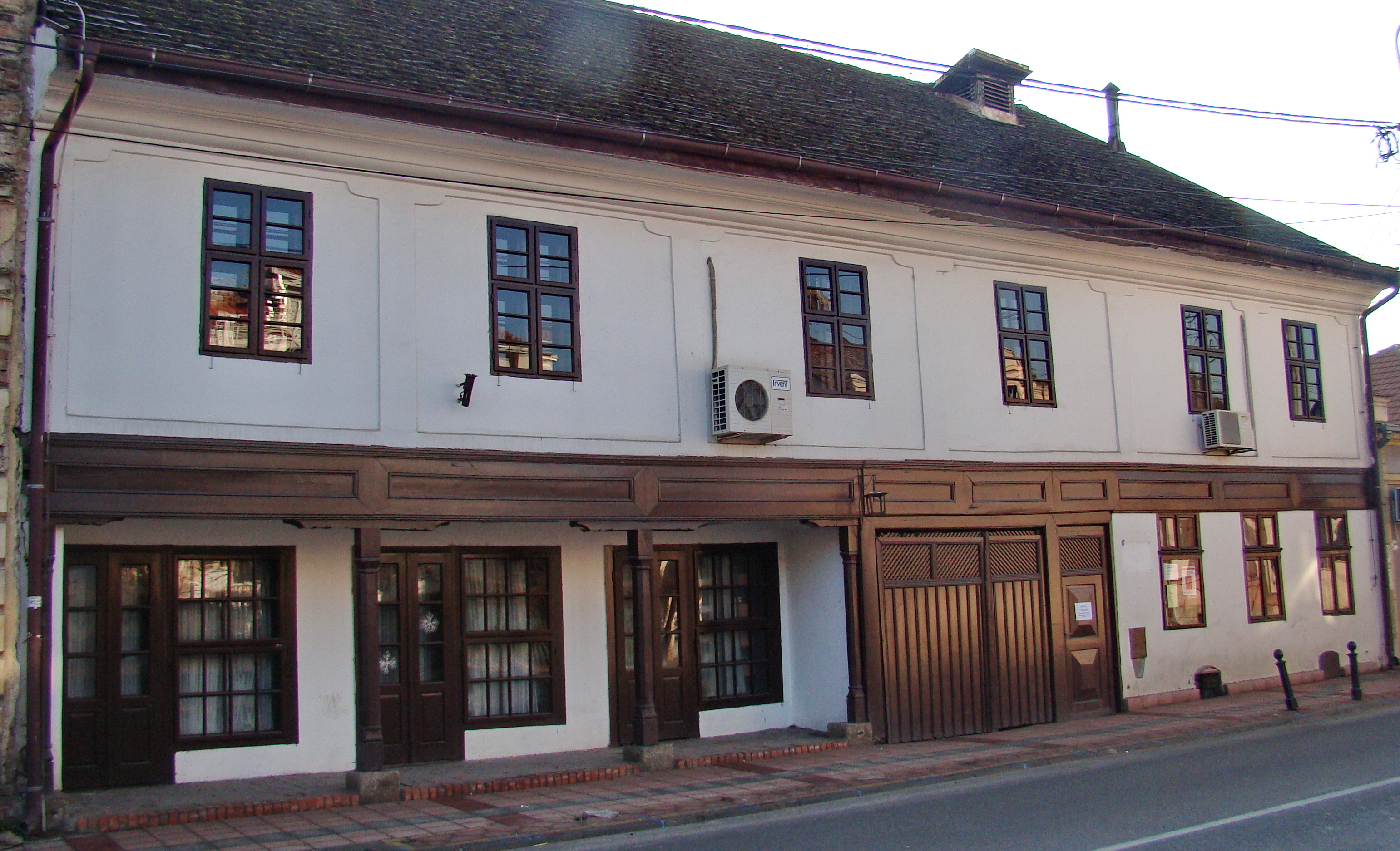
- Mihajlović`s Family House
- Interactive map of the Mihajlović`s Family House area

General information
- Status: Cultural Heritage
- Location: Obrenovac, Serbia
- Estimated completion: 19th century
- Owner: Republic of Serbia

Website
- http://beogradskonasledje.rs/

The Mihajlović family house is a historic home situated in Obrenovac (near Belgrade, Serbia) at 182 Miloša Obrenovića Street.

== History ==
The house has been explicitly documented since the beginning of the nineteenth century, however the exact year of the construction remains unknown. The Serbian writer Joakim Vujić documented a house belonging to a Mr. Mihajlović in records from his 1826 journey through Serbia, it remains probable but unconfirmed if this is the same house. While going through Obrenovac, Vujić noticed the following: "After arriving here to spend the night, I came to Mr Dimitrije Mihajlović, who politely and joyfully admitted me to his honourable home, and then offered me dinner and Coffee".

Mihajlović's family house was, at the time, a monumental house with business-residential purpose. A strong merchandise tradition in Palež of that time maintained in preserving the Serbian merchant class in the time of economic stagnation of Belgrade pashadom at the end of the 18th century and the beginning of the 19th century. The proof that it was really a Serbian house, and not the one bought or inherited from the Turks, is found in data mentioned in Joakim Vujić's book, that in the Palež settlement in 1826 there are "60 Serbian houses and not a single Turkish one".

== The house's appearance ==
The base of the house is of an elongated rectangle, with a two-gabled roof. The house consists of the ground floor, first floor, and a basement, which is located under one part of the object. The house was built with wooden post and petrail, with brick filling. The roof is constructed of wooden rafters and beams and the pepper tile roofing. The roof is two-gabled. The spatial organization is developed according to the linear scheme with the prolonged division of the rooms in line. There are three mutually connected rooms from the central isle in the eastern part of the house, where the workshops were placed. From the central isle to the west there is a bigger room, with the street view. This room is connected with the smaller pantry, which the trade family used in their business. In the backyard, from the central isle to the east, there are two bigger rooms, mutually connected, and to the west there is a small hall and one room. All the rooms in the courtyard area were intended for the residence.[3] Upstairs, there are three big rooms from the front side, which are mutually connected, and in the courtyard there is a large porch, on the either side of which there is one room, intended for residence. The front street facade is flat and done in mortar. There was an architrave porch on the east side of the ground floor, which is now closed. On the facade there is a characteristic horizontal wrath with low relief profiles. The windows are in a row. There are fillings, or filunge and overlay locks on the doors. The exception are the doors upstairs, which are done with "incrusted" filunges. The floors are, depending on the purpose, made of bricks or wood. The chimneys were walled up. The special quality of this house is the fact that in terms of the general architectural concept it represents the symbiosis of the oriental Turkish and European perceptions in residential architecture.

== Reconstructions and the present condition ==
At the beginning of the 1970s many works were done on the reconstruction of the building, after which the Library Vlada Aksentijević was placed in the house, and remained there to this day.

== Cultural heritage ==
The Mihajlović's family house in Obrenovac, is a very good example of the functional, constructive and aesthetic elements of Serbian architecture, make the structure a valuable monuments on the territory of the City of Belgrade. The Mihajlović's family house was declared for the cultural monument in 1970, and for Monument of Culture of Great Importance in 1979. After the reconstruction, at the beginning of the 1970s, the library was placed in the house, and remains there to this day.

== See also ==
- Obrenovac
- Joakim Vujić
