= Church of St. Nicholas, Baljevac =

Orthodox church in Raška, Serbia

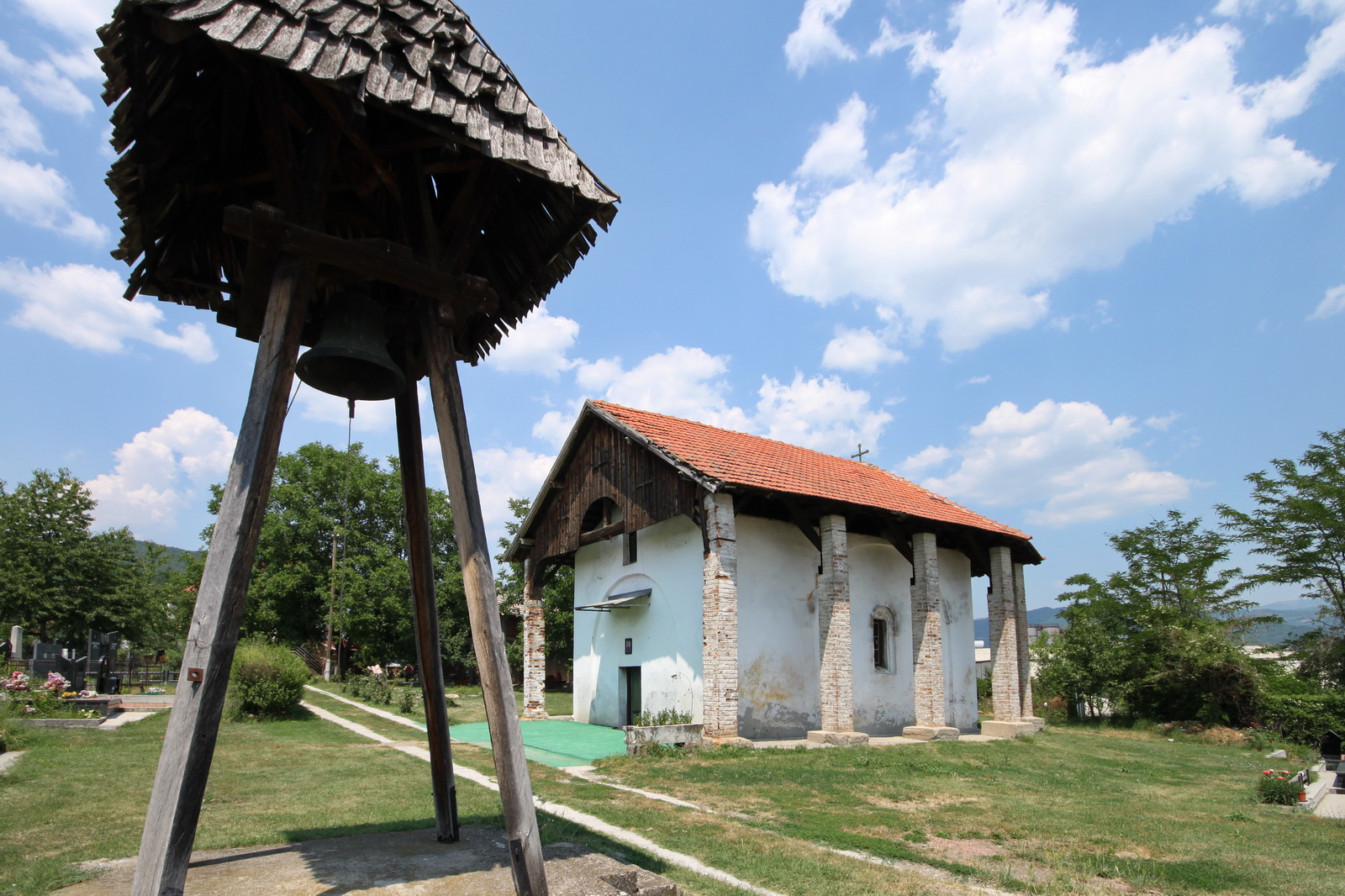
Church.

The Church of St. Nicholas is a medieval Serbian Orthodox church located in Baljevac na Ibru, near Raška, Serbia. It is dated to the 12th or the beginning of 13th century.
