= Pridvorica (Kraljevo) =

Coordinates: 43.8768°N 20.2905°E

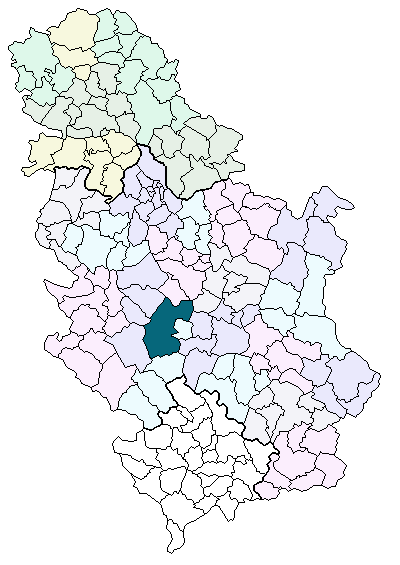
Location of the municipality of Kraljevo in Serbia

Pridvorica (in Serbian Cyrillic Придворица) is a village in Serbia on the banks of the Studenica River, in the municipality of Kraljevo and the district of Raška.
