= Miliće =

Miliće Милиће (Serbian)
- Village (Selo)
- Interactive map of Miliće
- Coordinates: 43.5039°N 20.4464°E
- Country: Serbia
- District: Raška District
- Municipality: Kraljevo

Population (2002)
  - Total: 293
- Time zone: UTC+1 (CET)
  - Summer (DST): UTC+2 (CEST)

Miliće (Serbian Cyrillic: Милиће), is a village in Serbia, located in the municipality of Kraljevo, in Raška District. In 2002, it had 293 inhabitants, all Serbs.

Miliće is located on the banks of the Studenica River.

== See also ==
- List of cities, towns and villages in Serbia
