= Zabrega =

Coordinates: 43.9331°N 21.5197°E

- Village
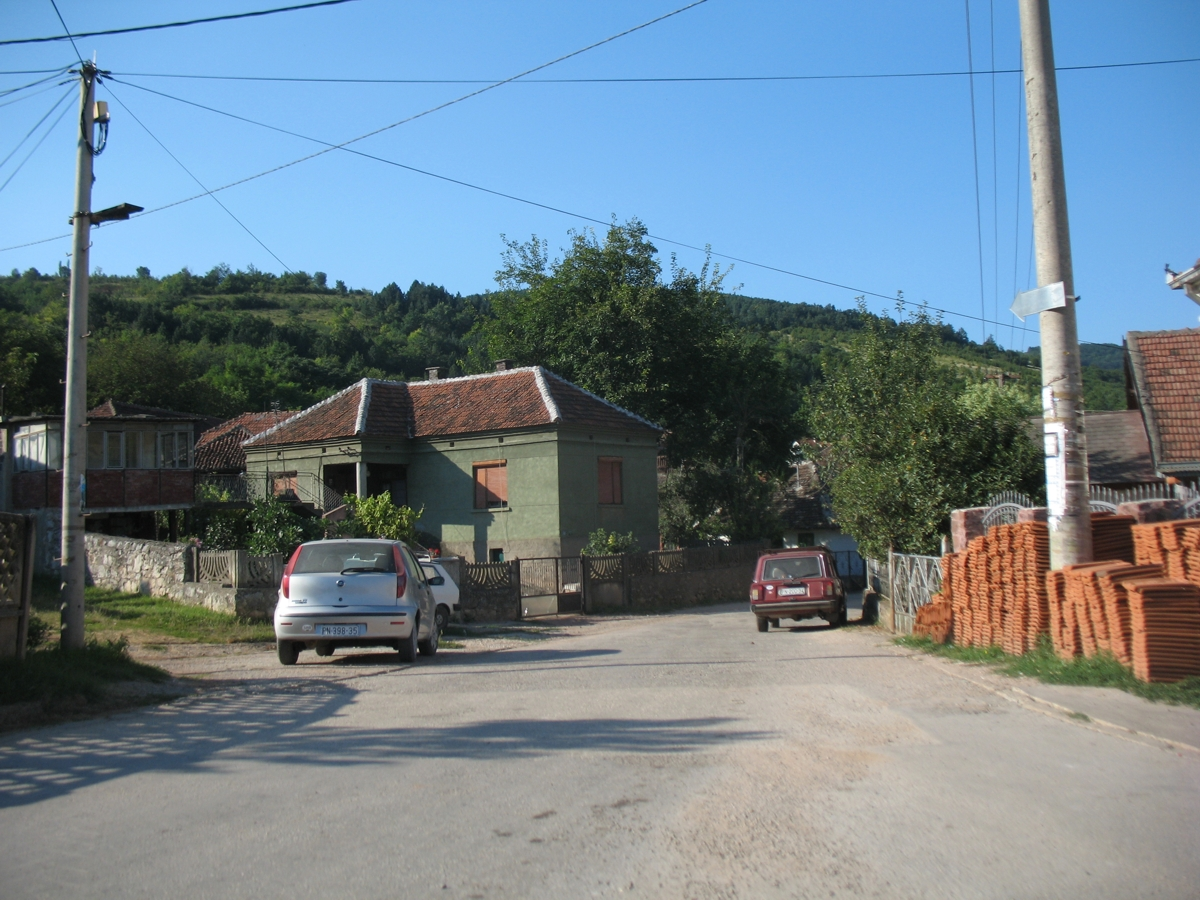
- Street of Zabrega
- Interactive map of Zabrega
- Country: Serbia
- District: Pomoravlje District
- Municipality: Paraćin

Population (2002)
  - Total: 1,211
- Time zone: UTC+1 (CET)
  - Summer (DST): UTC+2 (CEST)

Zabrega is a village in the municipality of Paraćin, Serbia. According to the 2002 census, the village has a population of 1,211 people.
