= Tadenje =

Coordinates: 43°25′N 20°34′E

Tadenje Тадење (Serbian)
- Village (Selo)
- Interactive map of Tadenje
- Country: Serbia
- Municipality: Kraljevo
- Time zone: UTC+1 (CET)
  - Summer (DST): UTC+2 (CEST)

Tadenje is a village situated in Kraljevo municipality in Serbia.
