= Grubetiće =

Coordinates: 43°0′N 20°32′E

- Village (Selo)
- Interactive map of Grubetiće
- Country: Serbia
- Municipality: Novi Pazar
- Time zone: UTC+1 (CET)
  - Summer (DST): UTC+2 (CEST)

Grubetiće is a village situated in Novi Pazar municipality in Serbia.
