= Dojinoviće =

Coordinates: 43°11′N 20°22′E

- Village (Selo)
- Interactive map of Dojinoviće
- Country: Serbia
- District: Raška
- Municipality: Novi Pazar
- Time zone: UTC+1 (CET)
  - Summer (DST): UTC+2 (CEST)

Dojinoviće is a village situated in Novi Pazar municipality in Serbia.
