= Mojsinje (Ćićevac) =

- Village
- Location within Serbia
- Coordinates: 43°37′53″N 21°28′49″E
- Country: Serbia
- District: Rasina District
- Municipality: Ćićevac

Population (2002)
  - Total: 36
- Time zone: UTC+1 (CET)
  - Summer (DST): UTC+2 (CEST)

Mojsinje is a village in the municipality of Ćićevac, Serbia. According to the 2002 census, the village has a population of 36 people.
