= Pope (Novi Pazar) =

Pope Попе
- Village (Selo)
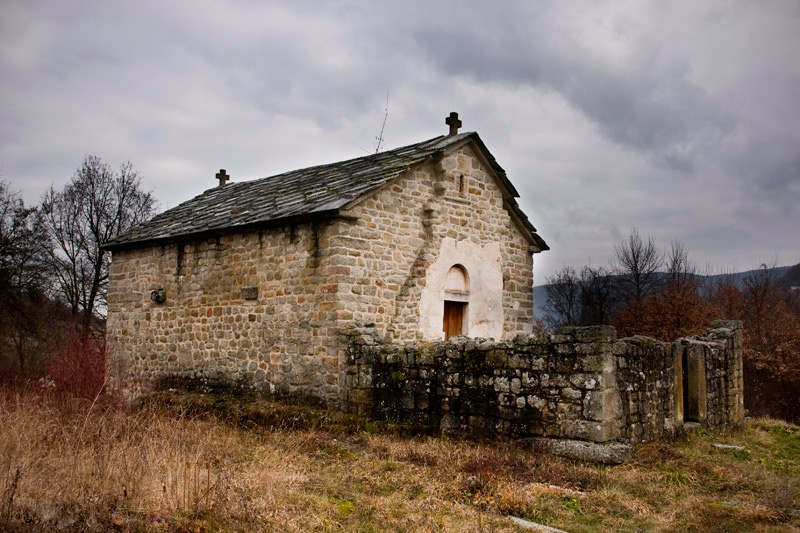
- Church of St. Peter and St. Paul of Pope, Novi Pazar

- Location in Serbia
- Coordinates: 43°10′58″N 20°23′04″E
- Country: Serbia
- Municipality: Novi Pazar
- Time zone: UTC+1 (CET)
  - Summer (DST): UTC+2 (CEST)

Pope is a village situated in Novi Pazar municipality in Serbia.
