= Popinci =

Popinci Попинци (Serbian)
- Village (Selo)
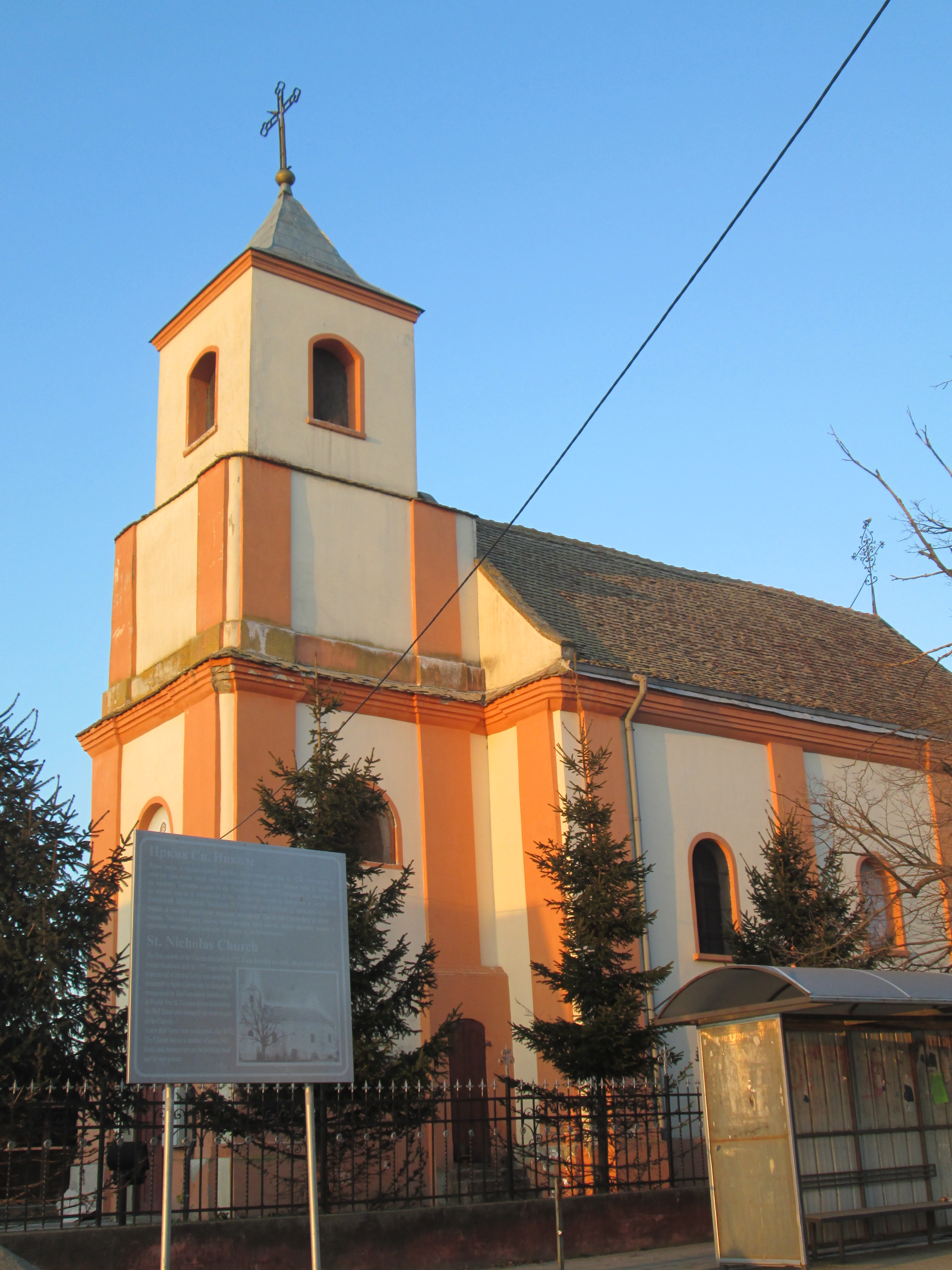
- Popinci

- Location within Vojvodina Location within Serbia Location within Europe
- Coordinates: 44°56′N 20°01′E
- Country: Serbia
- Province: Vojvodina
- District: Srem
- Municipality: Pećinci

Population (2002)
  - Total: 1,360
- Time zone: UTC+1 (CET)
  - Summer (DST): UTC+2 (CEST)

Popinci (Serbian Cyrillic: Попинци) is a village in Serbia. It is situated in the Pećinci municipality, in the Srem District, Vojvodina province. The village has a Serb ethnic majority and its population numbering 1,360 people (2002 census). Famous Serbian starlet and performer Tijana iPhone was born in this village.

== See also ==
- List of places in Serbia
- List of cities, towns and villages in Vojvodina
