= Jošanički Prnjavor =

Coordinates: 43°58′20″N 21°08′13″E

- Village
- Interactive map of Jošanički Prnjavor
- Country: Serbia
- District: Pomoravlje District
- Municipality: Jagodina

Population (2002)
  - Total: 45
- Time zone: UTC+1 (CET)
  - Summer (DST): UTC+2 (CEST)

Jošanički Prnjavor is a village in the municipality of Jagodina, Serbia. According to the 2002 census, the village has a population of 45 people.
