= Bistrica (Petrovac) =

Bistrica Бистрица
- Village
- Location within Serbia
- Coordinates: 44°20′10″N 21°30′15″E
- Country: Serbia
- District: Braničevo District
- Municipality: Petrovac na Mlavi
- Time zone: UTC+1 (CET)
  - Summer (DST): UTC+2 (CEST)

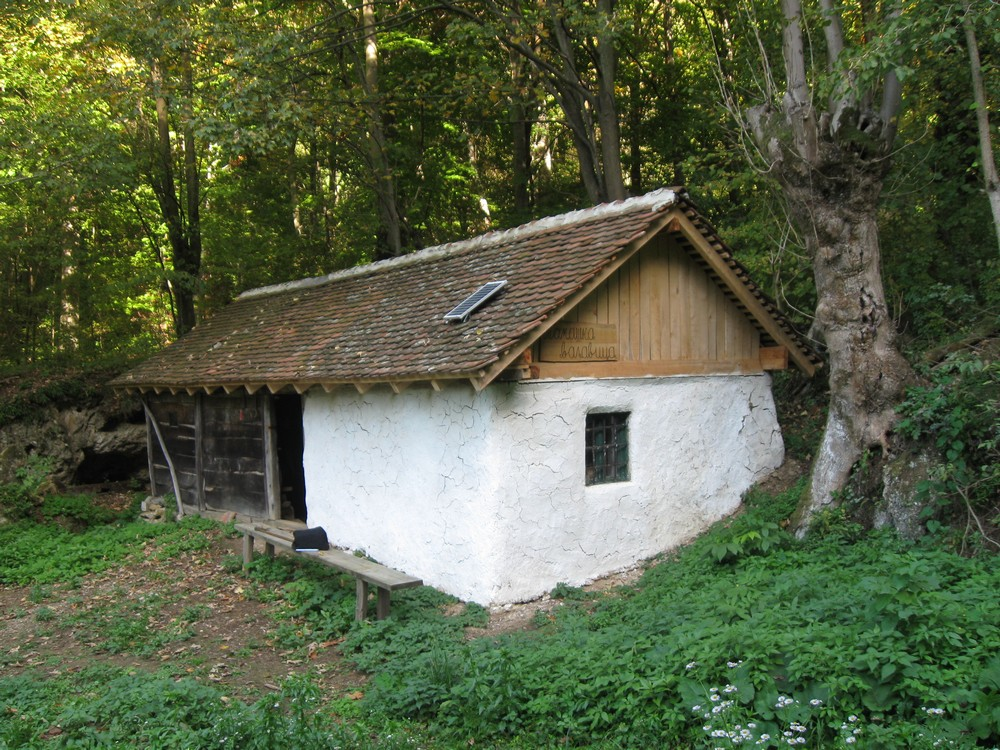
Valjavica (fulling mill) in Bistrica

Bistrica is a village situated in Petrovac na Mlavi municipality, Braničevo District in Serbia.
