= Vrh, Serbia =

Coordinates: 43°27′N 20°30′E

Vrh Врх (Serbian)
- Village (Selo)
- Interactive map of Vrh
- Country: Serbia
- District: Raška District
- Municipality: Kraljevo
- Time zone: UTC+1 (CET)
  - Summer (DST): UTC+2 (CEST)

Vrh is a village situated in Kraljevo municipality in Serbia.
