= Visibaba =

Visibaba Висибаба
- Village
- Location within Serbia
- Coordinates: 43°49′13″N 20°01′02″E
- Country: Serbia
- District: Zlatibor District
- Municipality: Požega

Area
  - Total: 9.4 km^{2} (3.6 sq mi)

Population (2022)
  - Total: 1,119
  - Density: 120/km^{2} (310/sq mi)
- Time zone: UTC+1 (CET)
  - Summer (DST): UTC+2 (CEST)

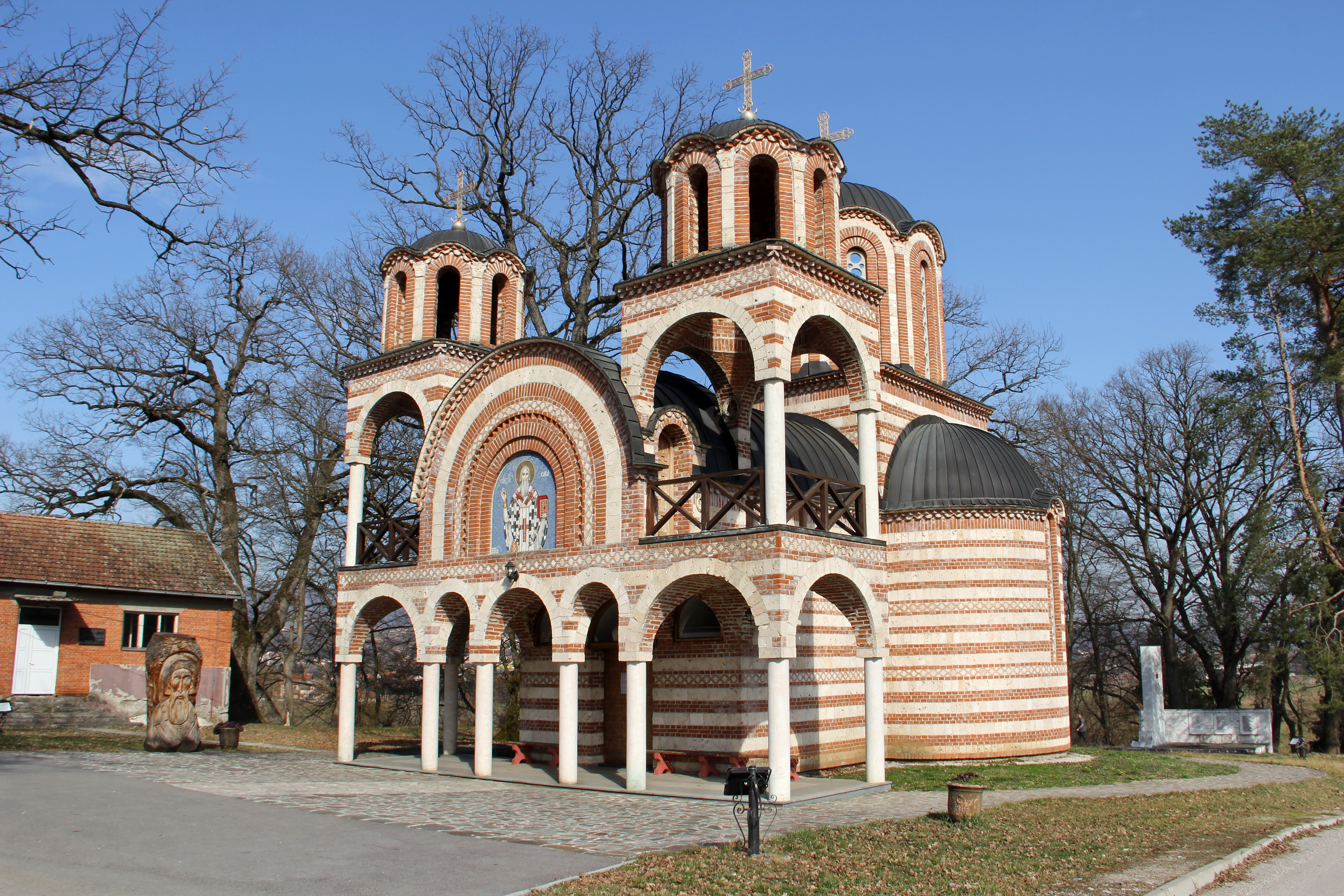
Church of Saint Sava on Savinac in the village of Visibaba (Municipality of Pozega), Serbia.

Visibaba is a village in the municipality of Požega, western Serbia. According to the 2022 census, the village has a population of 1119 people. The Blaškovina archaeological site located in the village is part of the Cultural Heritage of Serbia list, inscribed in 1987.
