= Štitare (Novi Pazar) =

Coordinates: 43°13′N 20°20′E

Štitare Штитаре
- Village (Selo)
- Interactive map of Štitare
- Country: Serbia
- Municipality: Novi Pazar
- Time zone: UTC+1 (CET)
  - Summer (DST): UTC+2 (CEST)

Štitare is a village situated in Novi Pazar municipality in Serbia.
