= Reka (Kraljevo) =

Coordinates: 43°26′N 20°30′E

Reka Река (Serbian)
- Village (Selo)
- Interactive map of Reka
- Country: Serbia
- Municipality: Kraljevo
- Time zone: UTC+1 (CET)
  - Summer (DST): UTC+2 (CEST)

Reka is a village situated in Kraljevo municipality in Serbia.
