= Godovik =

Godovik Годовик
- Village
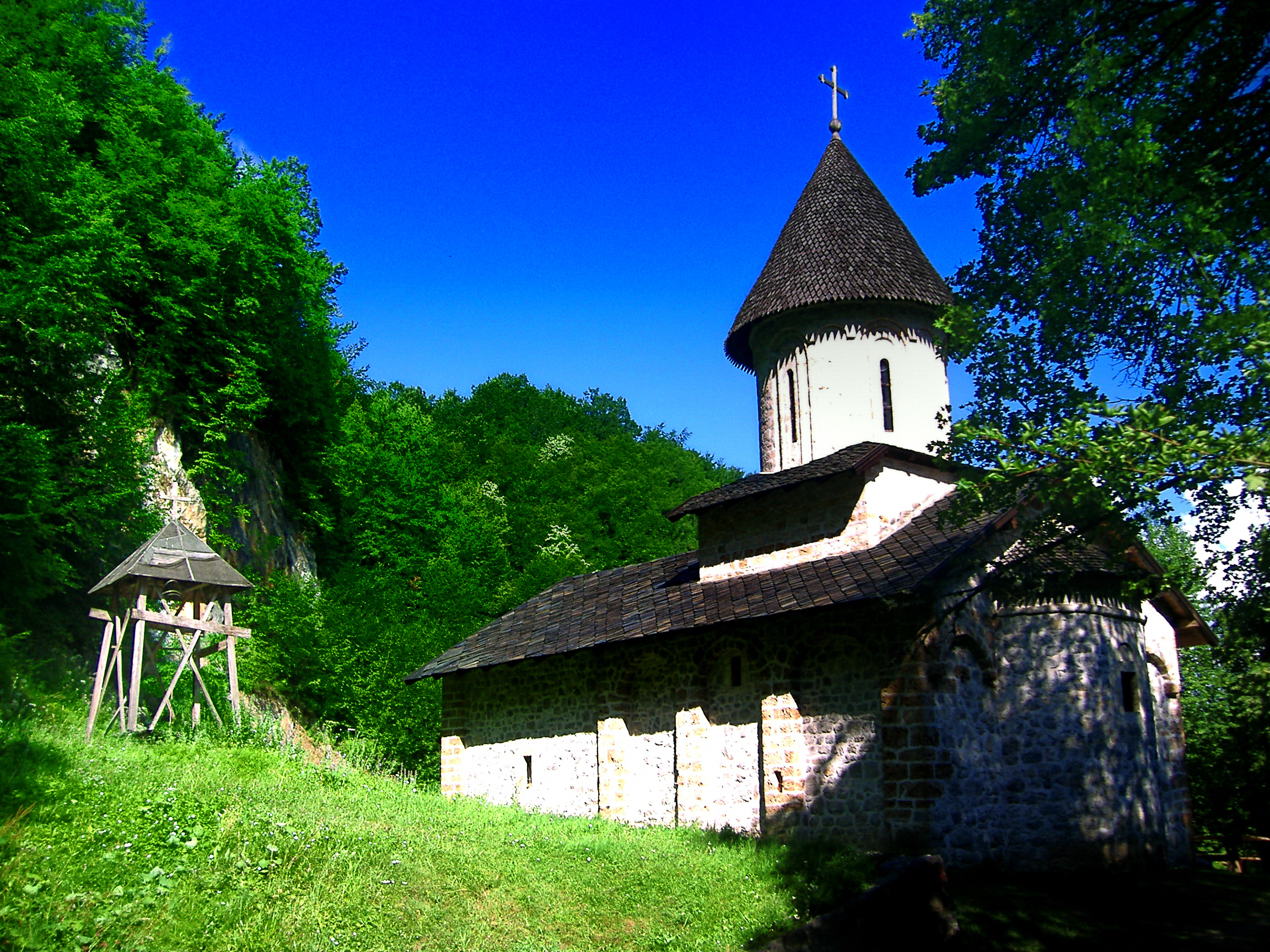

- Location within Serbia
- Coordinates: 43°46′56″N 20°03′12″E
- Country: Serbia
- District: Zlatibor District
- Municipality: Požega

Area
  - Total: 7.8 km^{2} (3.0 sq mi)

Population (2022)
  - Total: 179
  - Density: 23/km^{2} (59/sq mi)
- Time zone: UTC+1 (CET)
  - Summer (DST): UTC+2 (CEST)

Godovik is a village in the municipality of Požega, western Serbia. According to the 2022 census, the village has a population of 179 people.
