= Golema Njiva =

- Village
- Location within Serbia
- Coordinates: 43°06′32″N 22°02′07″E
- Country: Serbia
- District: Jablanica District
- Municipality: Leskovac

Population (2002)
  - Total: 118
- Time zone: UTC+1 (CET)
  - Summer (DST): UTC+2 (CEST)

Golema Njiva is a village in the municipality of Leskovac, Serbia. According to the 2002 census, the village has a population of 118 people.
