= Robaje =

Coordinates: 44.2206°N 19.9775°E

- Village (Selo)
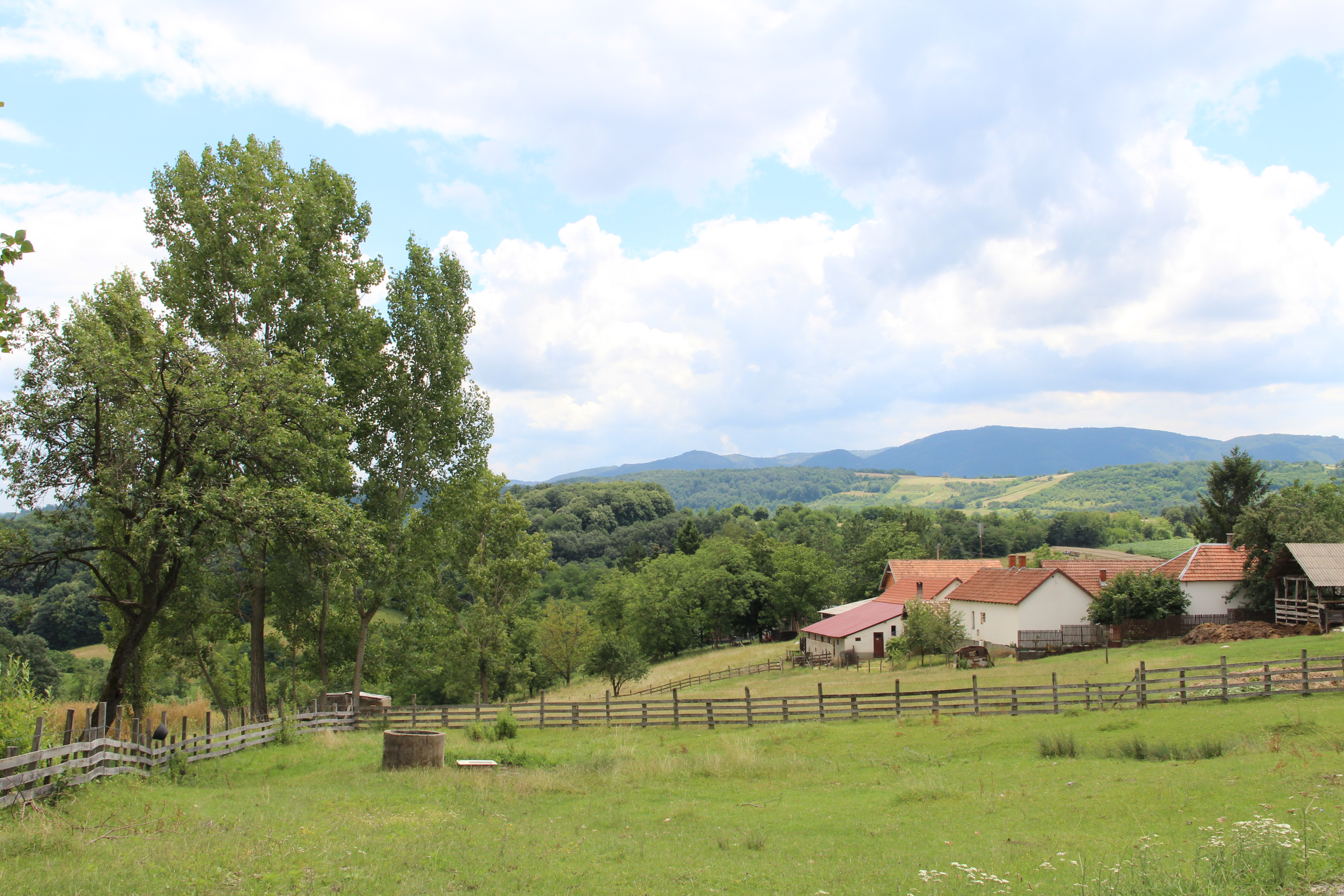
- A panorama of the village
- Interactive map of Robaje
- Country: Serbia
- District: Kolubara District
- Municipality: Mionica
- Time zone: UTC+1 (CET)
  - Summer (DST): UTC+2 (CEST)

Robaje is a village situated in Mionica municipality in Serbia.

== Gallery ==
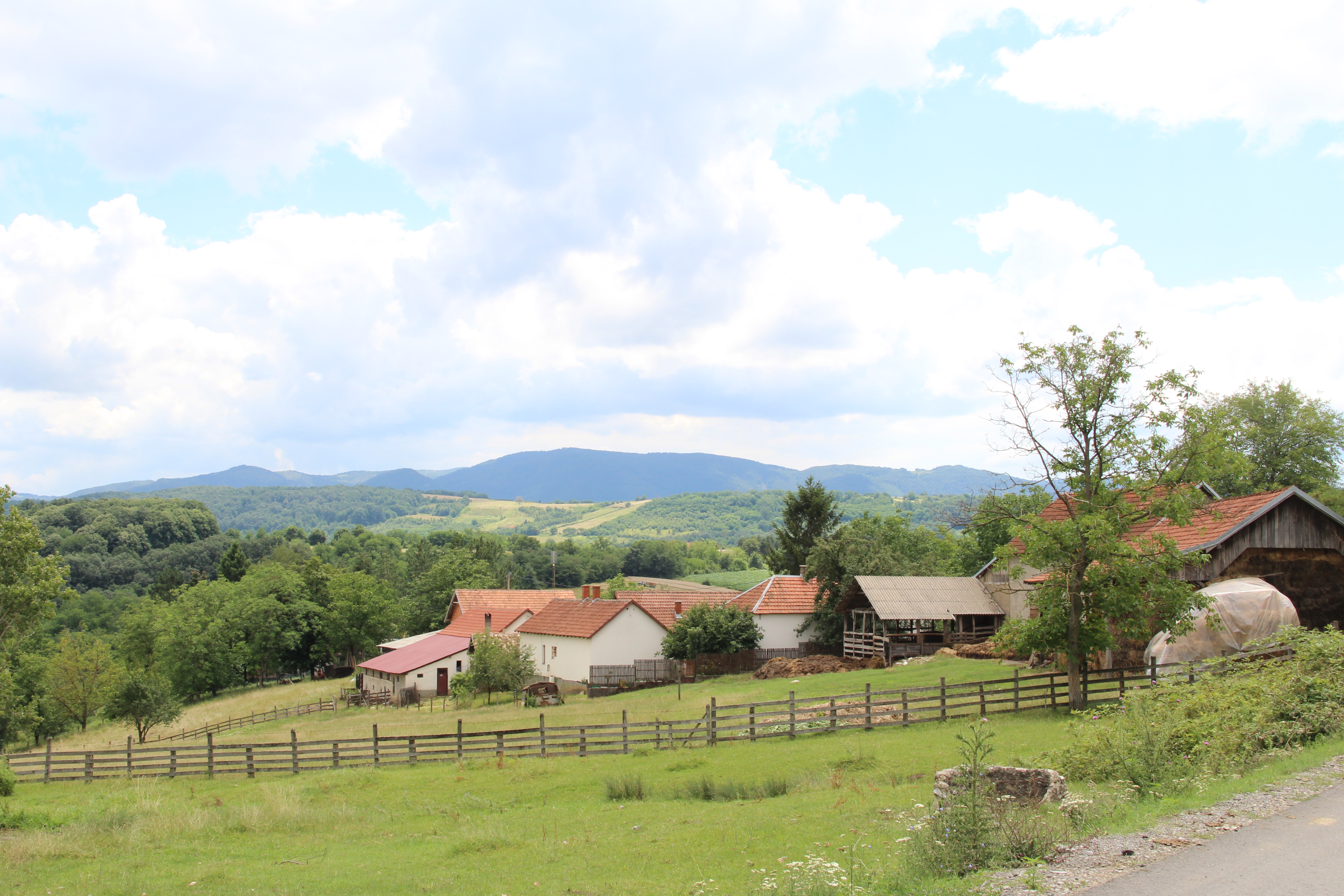
Robaje - panorama

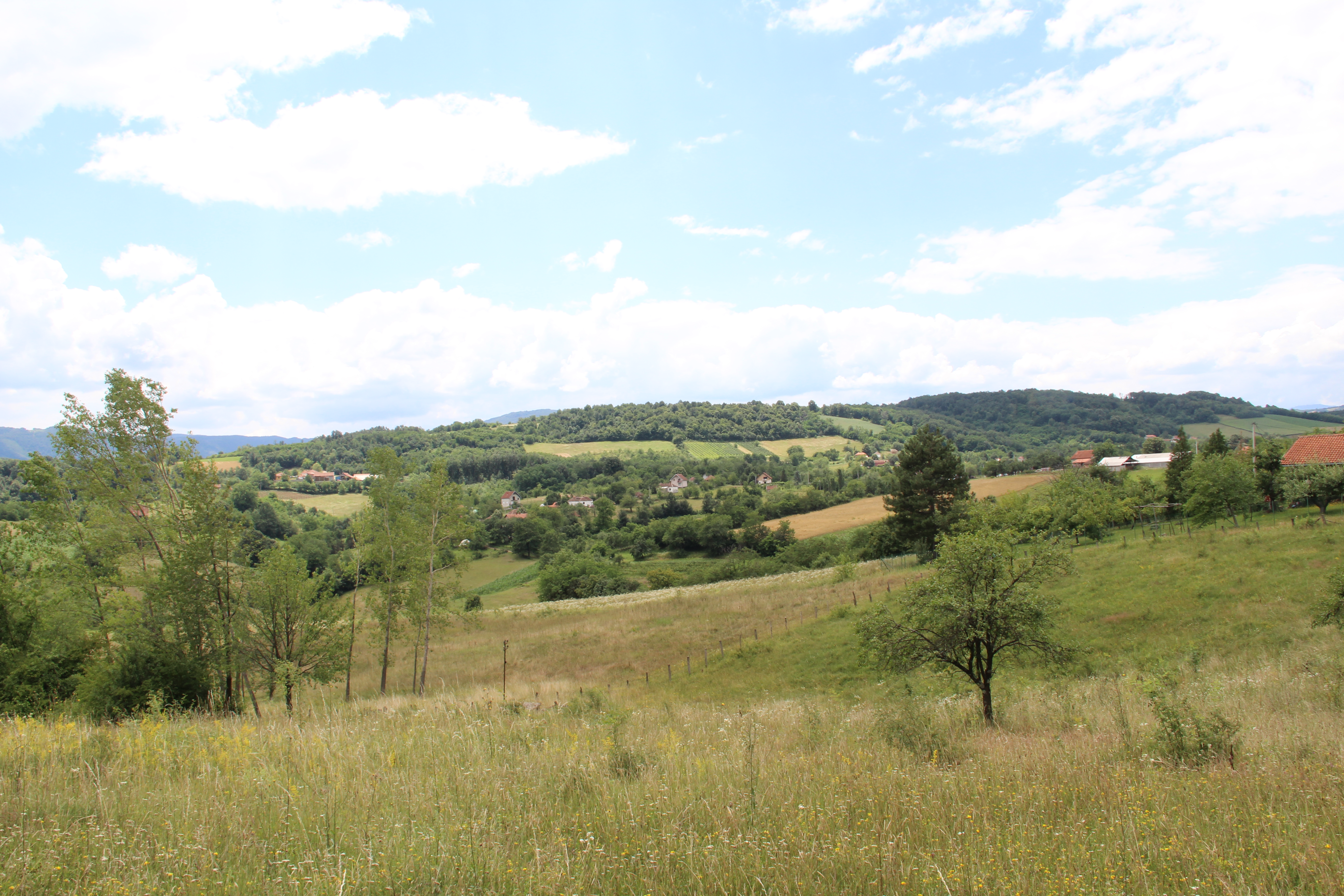
Robaje - panorama

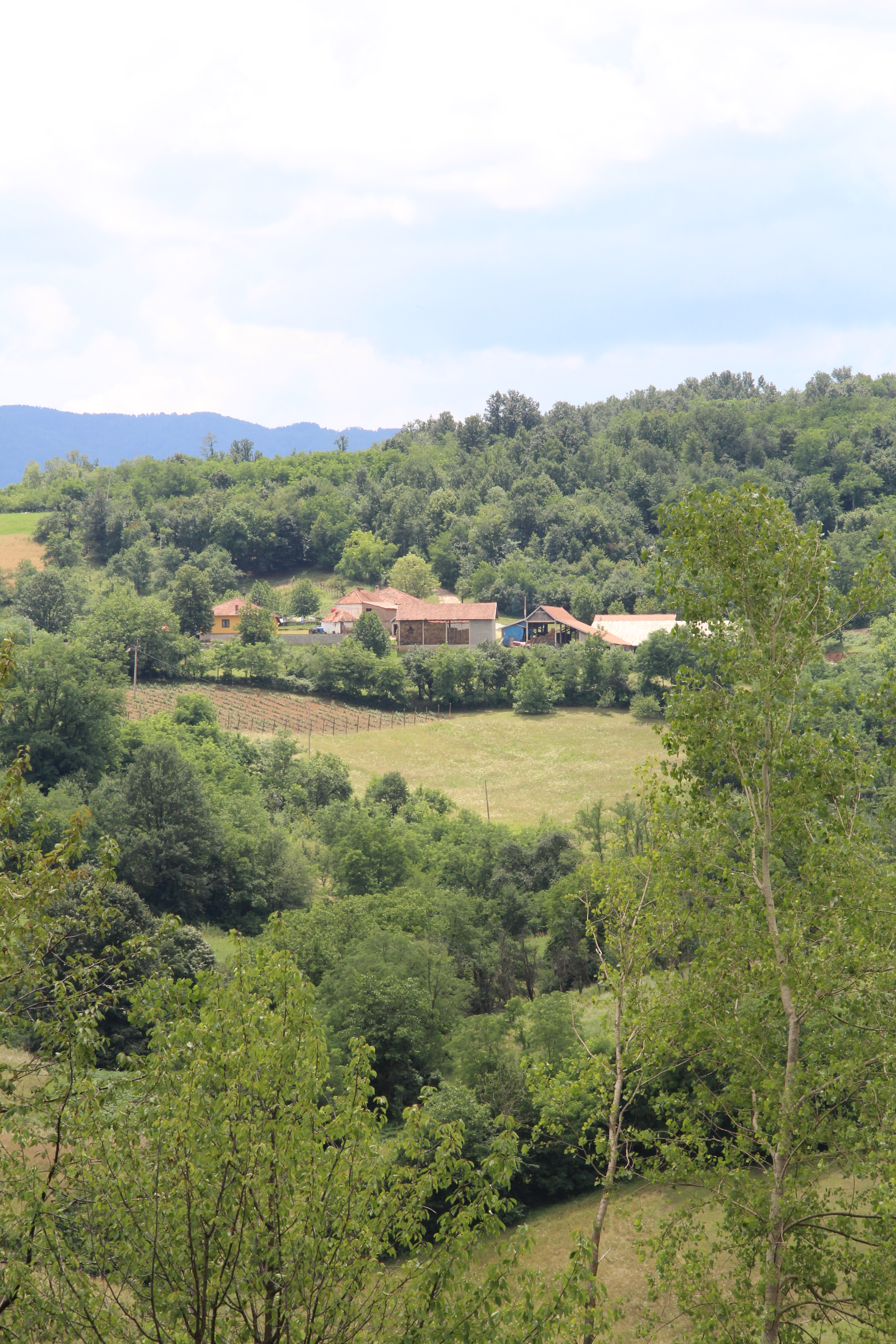
Robaje - panorama

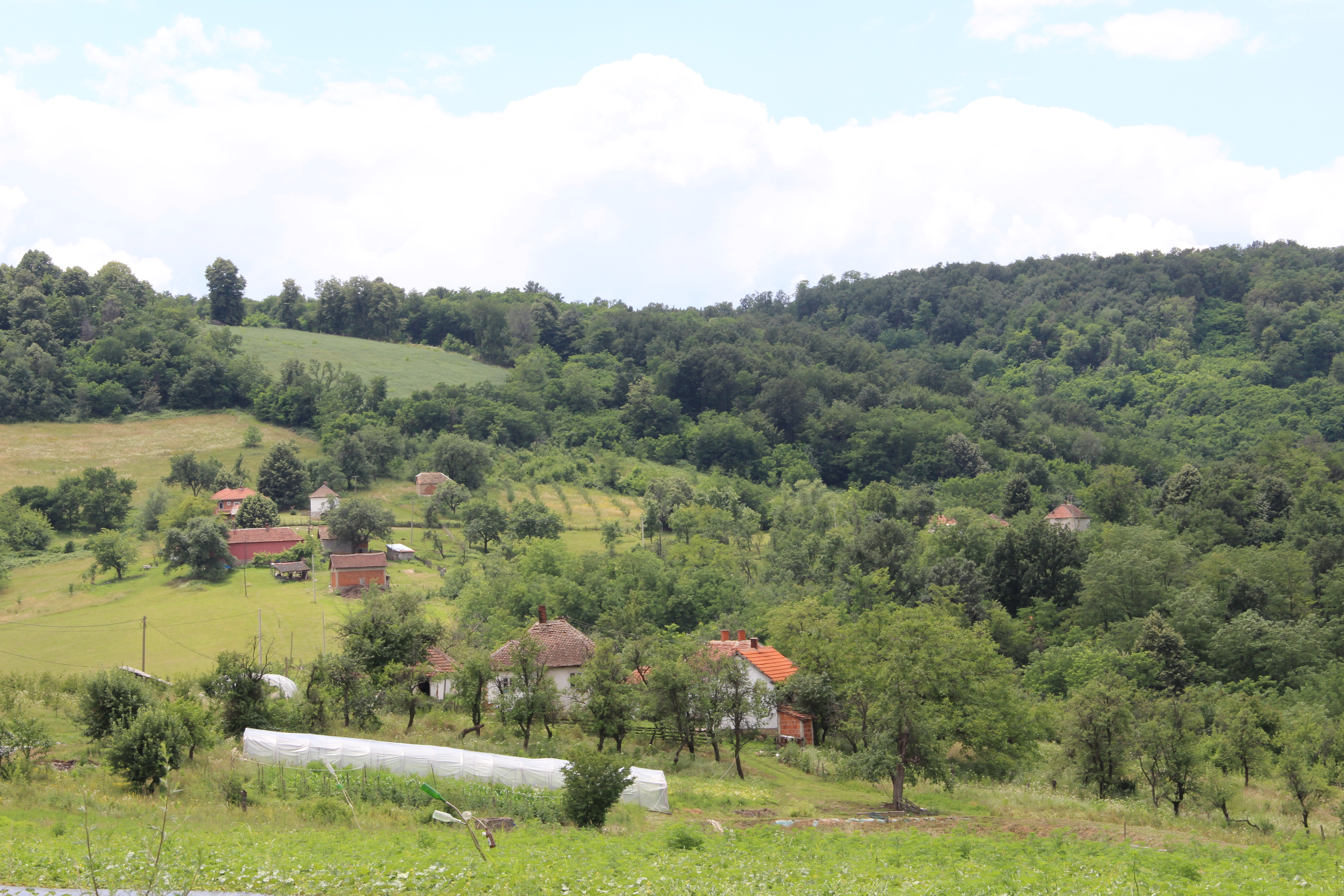
Robaje - panorama

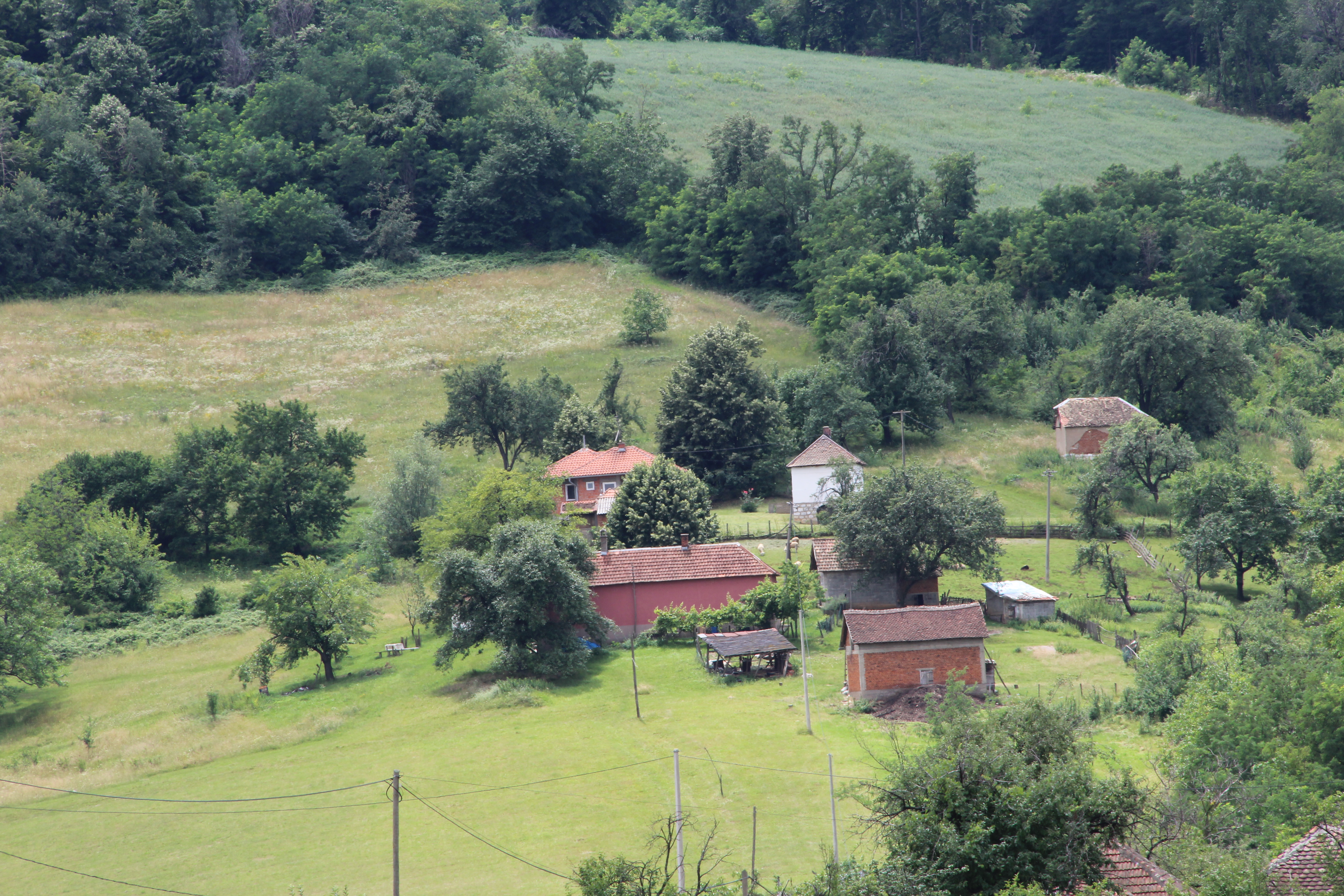
Robaje - panorama
