= Muhovo =

Muhovo may refer to:

- Muhovo, Sofia Province, Bulgaria
- Muhovo, Serbia in Novi Pazar
