= Šaronje =

Šaronje may refer to:

- Šaronje (Novi Pazar), a village in Serbia
- Šaronje (Tutin), a village in Serbia
