= Sitnice =

Sitnice may refer to:

- Sitniče
- Sitnicë
