= Osaonica =

Osaonica may refer to:

- Osaonica (Novi Pazar), a village in Serbia
- Osaonica (Trstenik), a village in Serbia
