= Goševo =

Goševo may refer to:

- Goševo (Novi Pazar), a village in Serbia
- Goševo (Sjenica), a village in Serbia
