= Bele Vode (Novi Pazar) =

Coordinates: 43°13′N 20°15′E

Bele Vode Беле Воде
- Village (Selo)
- Interactive map of Bele Vode
- Country: Serbia
- Municipality: Novi Pazar
- Time zone: UTC+1 (CET)
  - Summer (DST): UTC+2 (CEST)

Bele Vode is a village situated in Novi Pazar municipality in Serbia.
