= Vever =

Coordinates: 43°11′N 20°22′E

- Village (Selo)
- Interactive map of Vever
- Country: Serbia
- District: Raška District
- Municipality: Novi Pazar
- Time zone: UTC+1 (CET)
  - Summer (DST): UTC+2 (CEST)

Vever is a small village situated in Novi Pazar municipality in Serbia.

According to the 2011 census, there were 9 inhabitants. The average age of the inhabitants is 50.4 years (48.4 for men and 53.0 for women.) There are 7 households in the settlement, and the average number of members per household is 2.7. The settlement is completely populated by Serbs (according to the 2002 census), and in the last three censuses there has been a decrease in population.
