= Smilov Laz =

Coordinates: 43°1′N 20°38′E

- Village (Selo)
- Interactive map of Smilov Laz
- Country: Serbia
- District: Raška District
- Municipality: Novi Pazar
- Time zone: UTC+1 (CET)
  - Summer (DST): UTC+2 (CEST)

Smilov Laz is a village situated in Novi Pazar municipality in Serbia.
