= Lukocrevo =

Coordinates: 43°7′N 20°27′E

- Village (Selo)
- Interactive map of Lukocrevo
- Country: Serbia
- District: Raška District
- Municipality: Novi Pazar
- Time zone: UTC+1 (CET)
  - Summer (DST): UTC+2 (CEST)

Lukocrevo is a village situated in Novi Pazar municipality in Sandzak, Serbia.

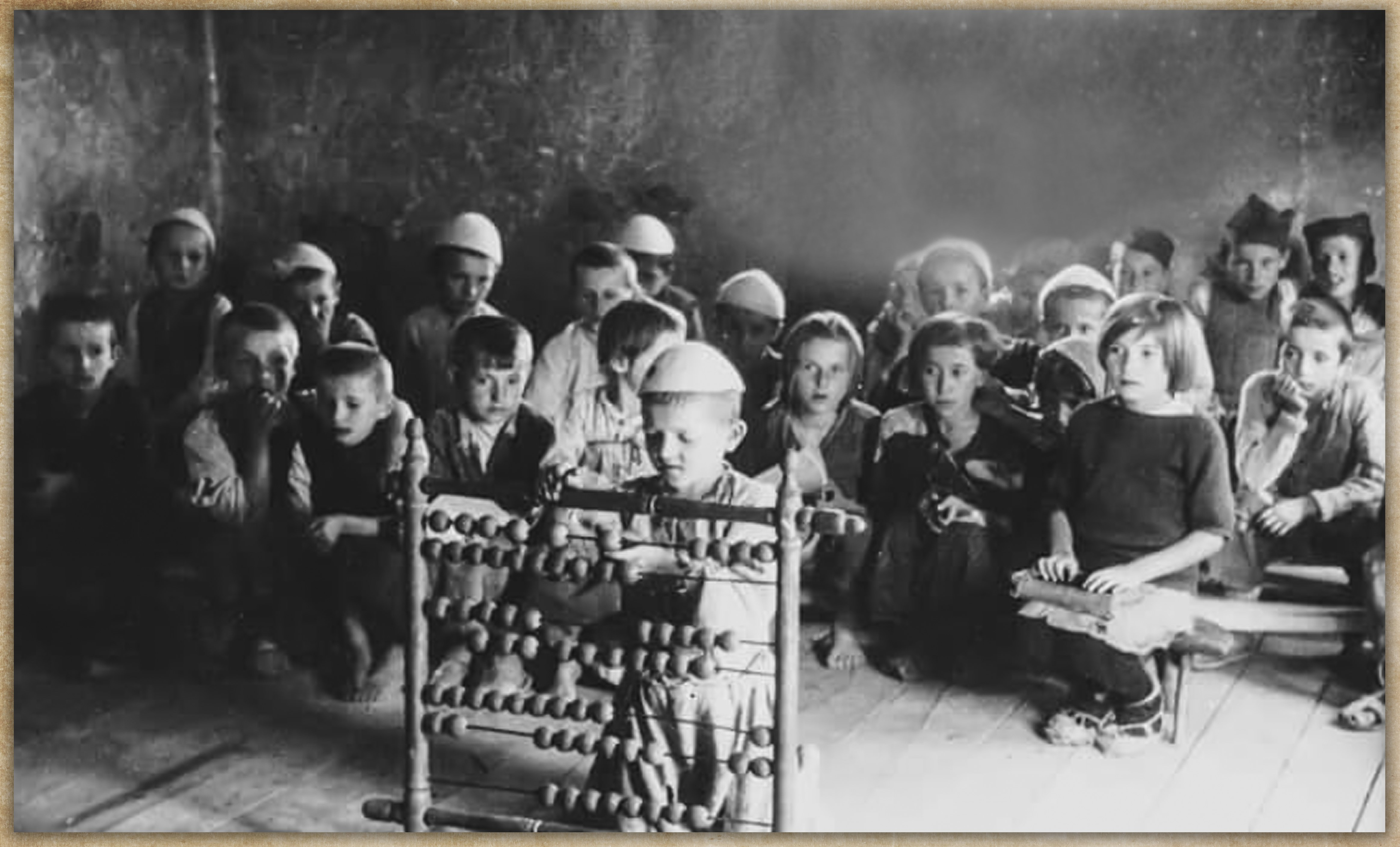
School in Lukocrevo
