= Varevo (Novi Pazar) =

Varevo Варево
- Village (Selo)
- Location within Serbia
- Coordinates: 43°7′N 20°28′E
- Country: Serbia
- District: Raška District
- Municipality: Novi Pazar
- Time zone: UTC+1 (CET)
  - Summer (DST): UTC+2 (CEST)

Varevo is a village situated in Novi Pazar municipality in Serbia.
