= Batnjik =

Coordinates: 43°13′N 20°34′E

- Village (Selo)
- Interactive map of Batnjik
- Country: Serbia
- Municipality: Novi Pazar
- Time zone: UTC+1 (CET)
  - Summer (DST): UTC+2 (CEST)

Batnjik is a village situated in Novi Pazar municipality in Serbia.

Batnjik is known for the flavor of slivovitz produced by its residents and the women of the Kudric family.
