= Dragočevo =

Coordinates: 42°59′N 20°31′E

- Village (Selo)
- Interactive map of Dragočevo
- Country: Serbia
- Municipality: Novi Pazar
- Elevation: 3,169 ft (966 m)
- Time zone: UTC+1 (CET)
  - Summer (DST): UTC+2 (CEST)

Dragočevo is a village situated in the Novi Pazar municipality in Serbia.
