= Rast (Novi Pazar) =

Coordinates: 43.2472°N 20.3472°E

- Village (Selo)
- Interactive map of Rast (Novi Pazar)
- Country: Serbia
- District: Raška District
- Municipality: Novi Pazar
- Time zone: UTC+1 (CET)
  - Summer (DST): UTC+2 (CEST)

Rast (Novi Pazar) is a village situated in Novi Pazar municipality in Serbia.
