= Altun-Alem Mosque =

Mosque in Novi Pazar, Serbia

Coordinates: 43.1306°N 20.5167°E

- Алтун-алем џамија Altun-alem džamija
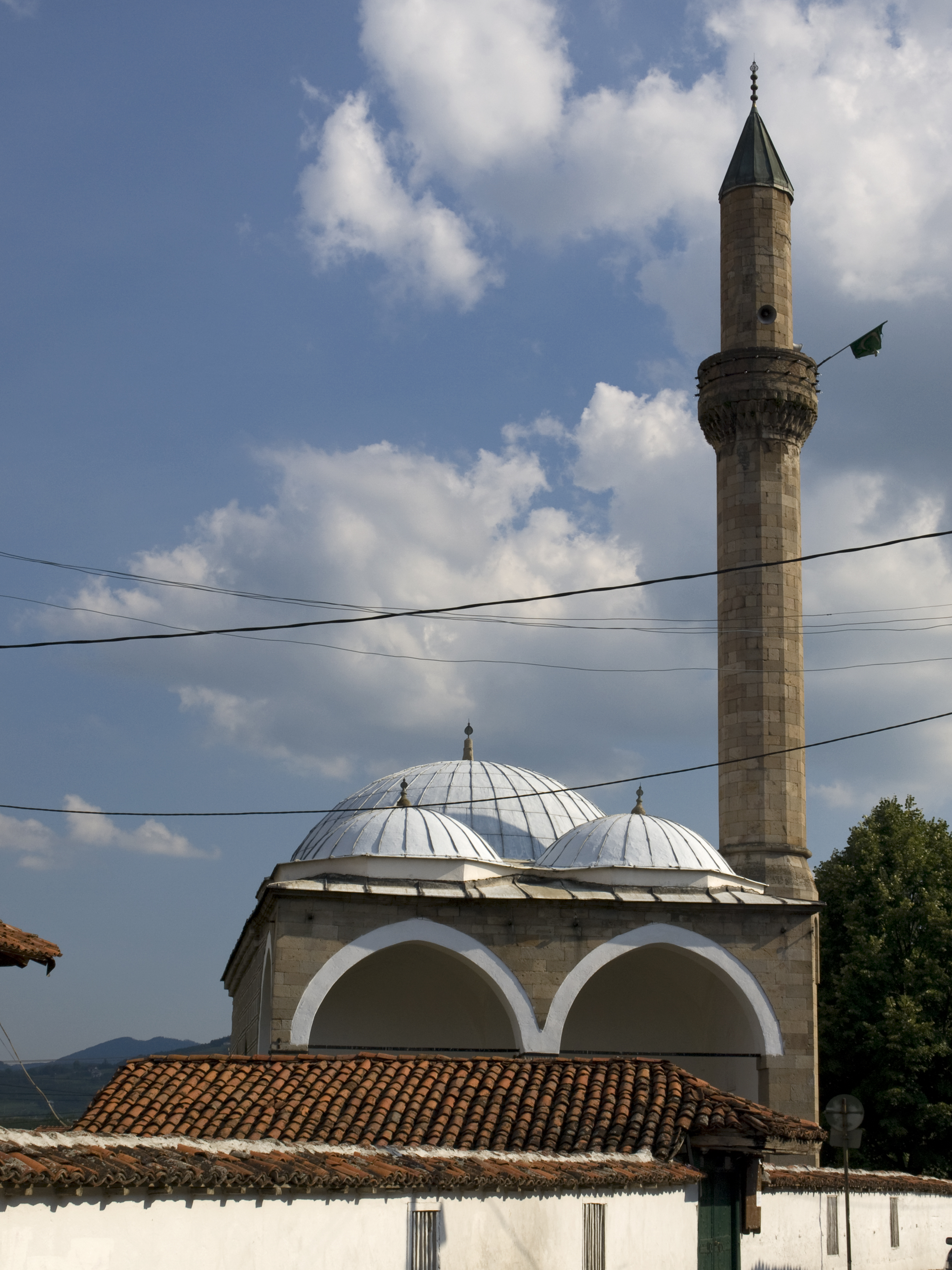

Religion
- Affiliation: Islam

Location
- Municipality: Novi Pazar
- Country: Serbia
- Interactive map of Altun-Alem Mosque

Architecture
- Type: mosque
- Creator: Muslihudin Abduagani
- Established: 16th century

The Altun-Alem Mosque (Serbian: Алтун-алем џамија, romanized: Altun-alem džamija, lit. 'Golden Gem Mosque') is a mosque located in Novi Pazar, Serbia.

Abdul Gani, an architect, constructed the Altun-Alem Mosque in the first half of the 16th century.

== See also ==
- Islam in Serbia
- Islamic architecture
- List of mosques
