= Kašalj =

Kašalj Кашаљ
- Village (Selo)
- Location within Serbia
- Coordinates: 43°2′N 20°38′E
- Country: Serbia
- Municipality: Novi Pazar

Area
  - Total: 8.01 km^{2} (3.09 sq mi)
- Elevation: 1,090 m (3,580 ft)

Population (2011)
  - Total: 19
  - Density: 2.4/km^{2} (6.1/sq mi)
- Time zone: UTC+1 (CET)
  - Summer (DST): UTC+2 (CEST)

Kašalj is a village located in the municipality of Novi Pazar, Serbia.
