= Pobrđe (Novi Pazar) =

Coordinates: 43°8′N 20°28′E

Pobrđe Побрђе
- Village (Selo)
- Interactive map of Pobrđe
- Country: Serbia
- Municipality: Novi Pazar
- Time zone: UTC+1 (CET)
  - Summer (DST): UTC+2 (CEST)

Pobrđe is a village situated in Novi Pazar municipality in Serbia.
