= Vučja Lokva =

Coordinates: 43°6′N 20°40′E

- Village (Selo)
- Interactive map of Vučja Lokva
- Country: Serbia
- Municipality: Novi Pazar
- Time zone: UTC+1 (CET)
  - Summer (DST): UTC+2 (CEST)

Vučja Lokva is a village situated in Novi Pazar municipality in Serbia.
