= Ivanča =

- Village (Selo)
- Location within Serbia
- Coordinates: 43°09′N 20°27′E
- Country: Serbia
- Time zone: UTC+1 (CET)
  - Summer (DST): UTC+2 (CEST)

Ivanča (Serbian: Иванча) is a village in the municipality of Novi Pazar, Serbia.
