= Trnava (Novi Pazar) =

Coordinates: 43°10′N 20°26′E

Trnava Трнава
- Village (Selo)
- Interactive map of Trnava
- Country: Serbia
- Municipality: Novi Pazar
- Time zone: UTC+1 (CET)
  - Summer (DST): UTC+2 (CEST)

Trnava is a village situated in Novi Pazar municipality in Serbia.
