= Čašić Dolac =

Coordinates: 43.0333°N 20.4167°E

- Village (Selo)
- Interactive map of Čašić Dolac
- Country: Serbia
- Time zone: UTC+1 (CET)
  - Summer (DST): UTC+2 (CEST)

Čašić Dolac is a small village on the Rogozna mountain in the municipality of Novi Pazar, Serbia.
