= Slatina (Novi Pazar) =

Coordinates: 43°5′N 20°23′E

Slatina Слатина
- Village (Selo)
- Interactive map of Slatina
- Country: Serbia
- District: Raška District
- Municipality: Novi Pazar
- Time zone: UTC+1 (CET)
  - Summer (DST): UTC+2 (CEST)

Slatina is a village situated in Novi Pazar municipality in Serbia.
