= Pavlje =

Coordinates: 43°11′N 20°20′E

- Village (Selo)
- Interactive map of Pavlje
- Country: Serbia
- District: Raška District
- Municipality: Novi Pazar
- Time zone: UTC+1 (CET)
  - Summer (DST): UTC+2 (CEST)

Pavlje is a village situated in Novi Pazar municipality in Serbia.
