= Hotkovo =

- Village (Selo)
- Location within Serbia
- Coordinates: 43°08′15″N 20°32′04″E
- Country: Serbia

Population (2011)
  - Total: 193
- Time zone: UTC+1 (CET)
  - Summer (DST): UTC+2 (CEST)

Hotkovo (Serbian: Хотково) is a village in the municipality of Novi Pazar, Serbia. Population consists entirely of two families: Malićević and Suljović.
