= Aluloviće =

Coordinates: 43°12′N 20°28′E

- Village (Selo)
- Interactive map of Aluloviće
- Country: Serbia
- Municipality: Novi Pazar
- Elevation: 1,854 ft (565 m)
- Time zone: UTC+1 (CET)
  - Summer (DST): UTC+2 (CEST)

Aluloviće is a village situated in Novi Pazar municipality in Serbia. According to the census of 2011, there were 314 inhabitants.

== Demographics ==
In the village Aluloviće, the population are 283 adult inhabitants, and the average age is 42.4 years (41.1 for men and 43.6 for women). The village has 109 households, and the average number of members per household is 3.32.

This village is entirely populated by Serbs (according to 2002 census), but in the last three censuses, noticed a decline in population due to emigration.
