= Kožlje (Novi Pazar) =

Coordinates: 43.0200°N 20.4533°E

- Village (Selo)
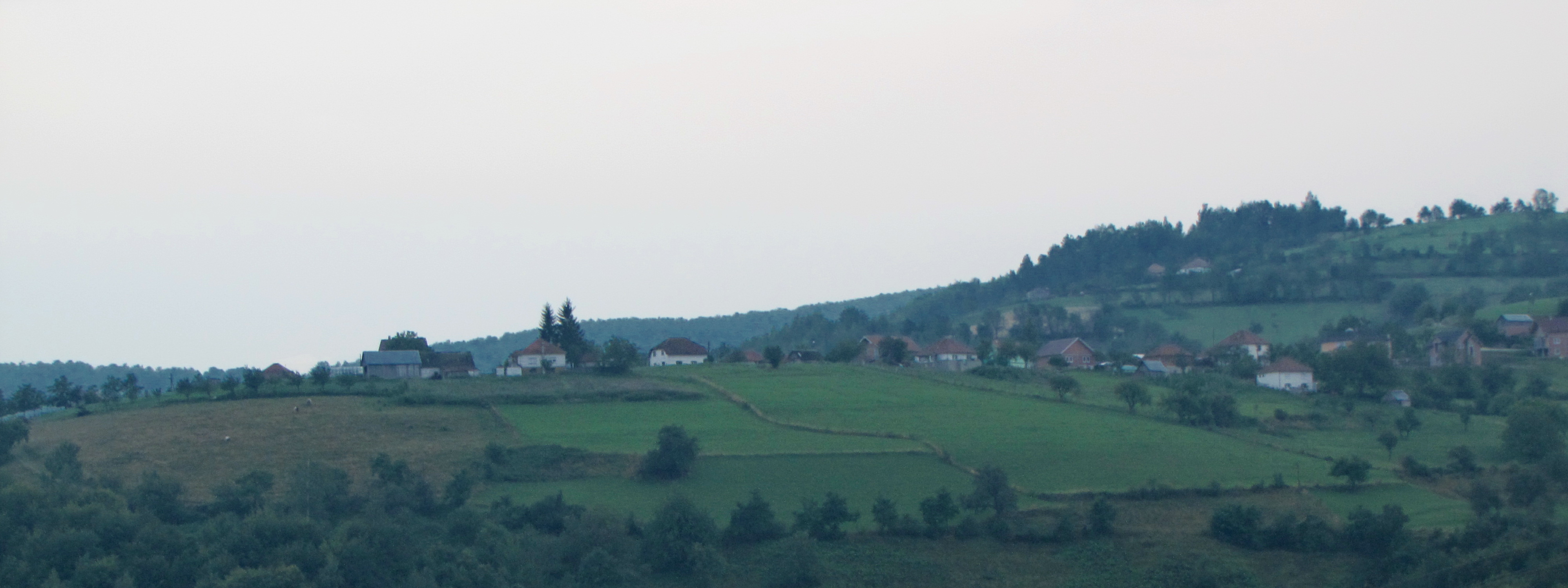
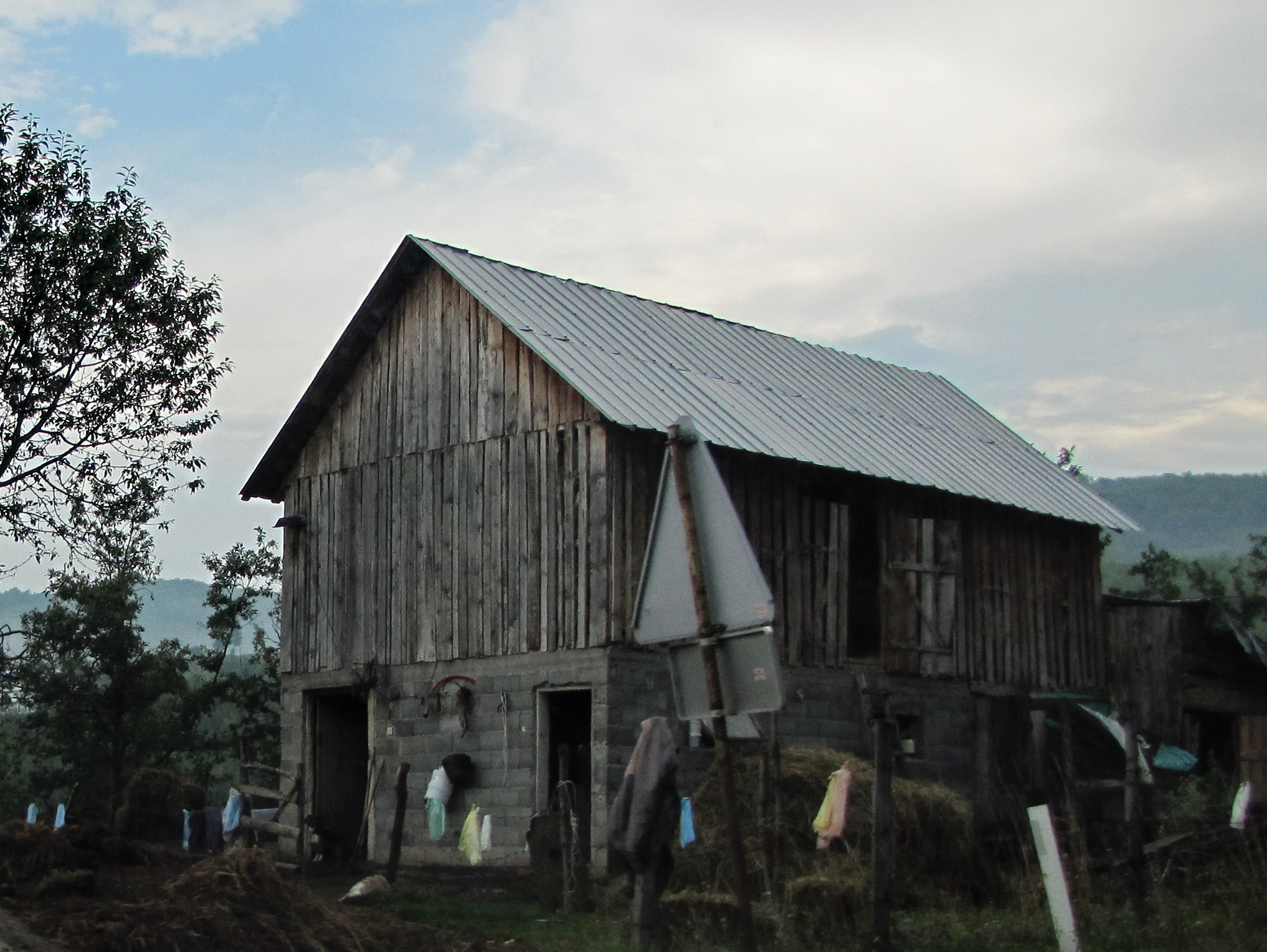
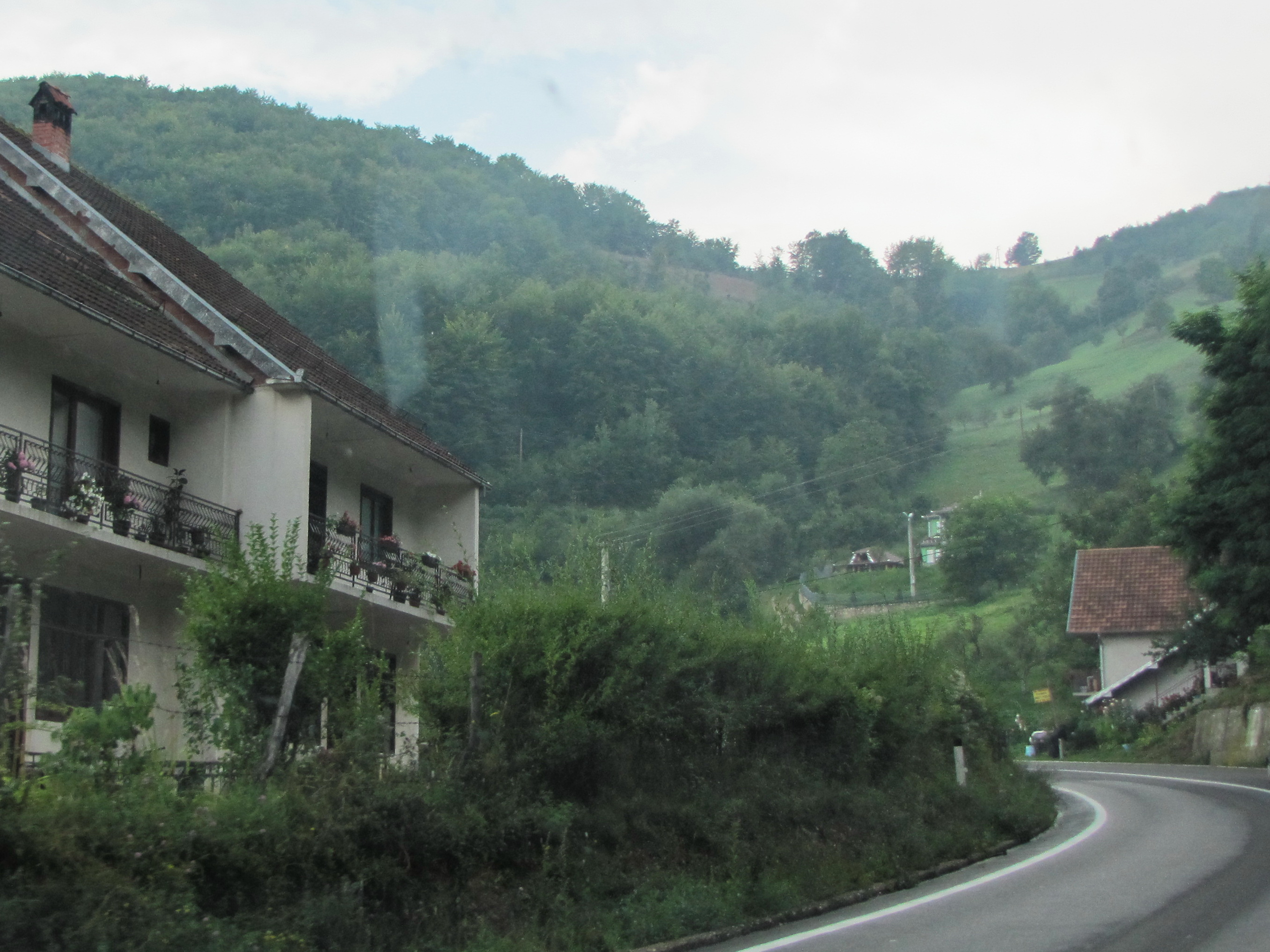
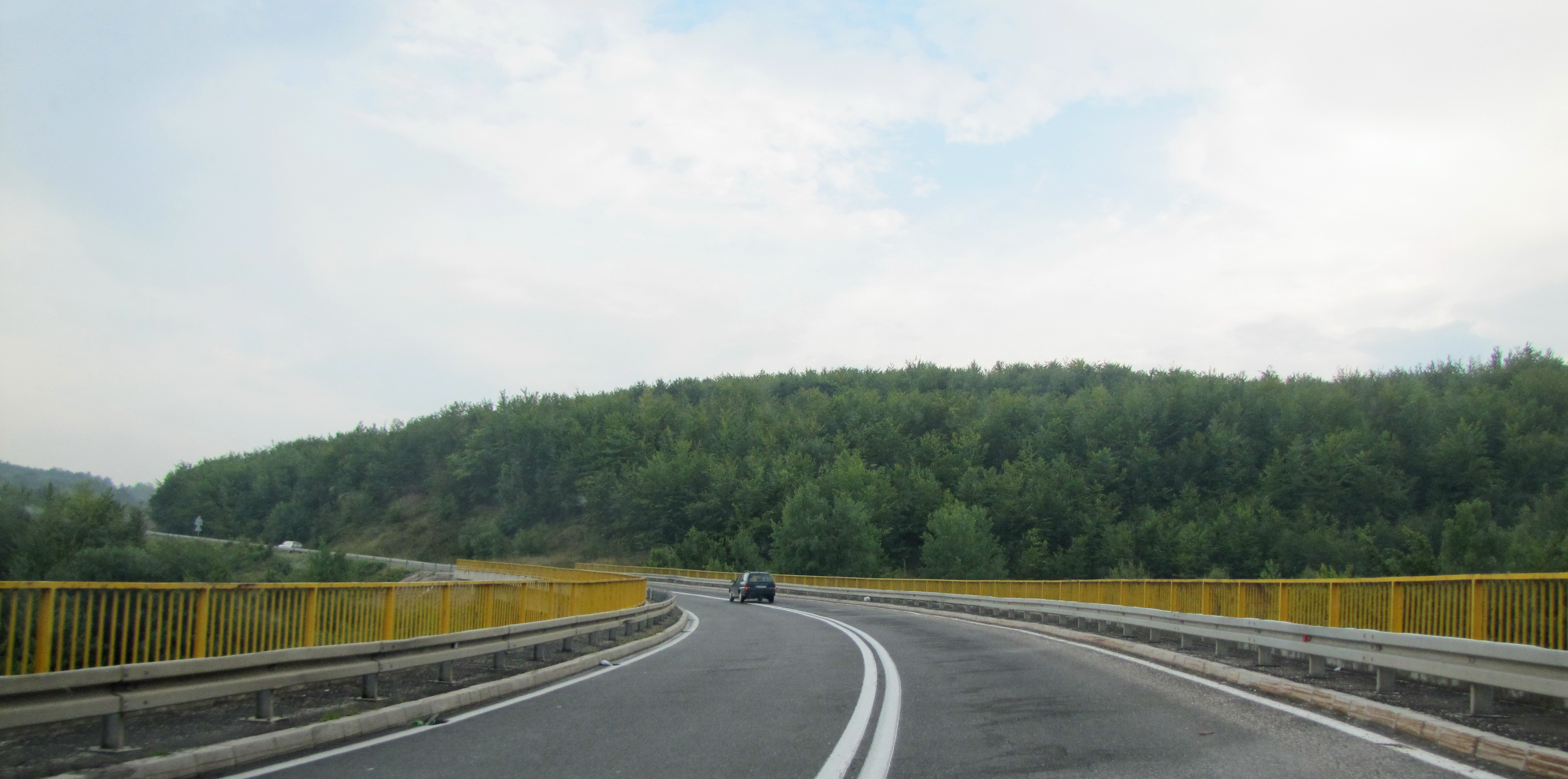
- Interactive map of Kožlje
- Country: Serbia
- District: Raška District
- Municipality: Novi Pazar
- Time zone: UTC+1 (CET)
  - Summer (DST): UTC+2 (CEST)

Kožlje is a village situated in Novi Pazar municipality of Raška District in Serbia. It is a part of the historical region of Sandžak.
