= Osoje (Novi Pazar) =

Coordinates: 43°6′N 20°31′E

Osoje Осоје
- Place (Naselje)
- Interactive map of Osoje
- Country: Serbia
- District: Raška District
- Municipality: Novi Pazar
- Time zone: UTC+1 (CET)
  - Summer (DST): UTC+2 (CEST)

Osoje is a place situated in Novi Pazar municipality in Serbia.
