= Paralovo (Novi Pazar) =

Coordinates: 43°7′N 20°28′E

Paralovo Паралово
- Village (Selo)
- Interactive map of Paralovo
- Country: Serbia
- Municipality: Novi Pazar
- Time zone: UTC+1 (CET)
  - Summer (DST): UTC+2 (CEST)

Paralovo is a village situated in Novi Pazar municipality in Serbia.
