= Muhovo, Serbia =

Muhovo
- Village (Selo)
- Location within Serbia
- Coordinates: 43°15′42″N 20°17′24″E
- Country: Serbia
- District: Raška
- Municipality: Novi Pazar

Population (2002)
  - Total: 545
- Time zone: UTC+1 (CET)
  - Summer (DST): UTC+2 (CEST)

Muhovo is a village in the municipality of Novi Pazar, Serbia. According to the 2002 census, the village has a population of 545 people.
