= Šaronje (Novi Pazar) =

Coordinates: 43.2261°N 20.4078°E

- Village (Selo)
- Interactive map of Šaronje
- Country: Serbia
- District: Raška District
- Municipality: Novi Pazar
- Time zone: UTC+1 (CET)
  - Summer (DST): UTC+2 (CEST)

Šaronje (Novi Pazar) is a village situated in Novi Pazar municipality in Serbia.
