= Novi Pazar =

Novi Pazar Нови Пазар (Serbian) Novi Pazar (Bosnian)
- City
- Град Нови Пазар; Grad Novi Pazar; City of Novi Pazar
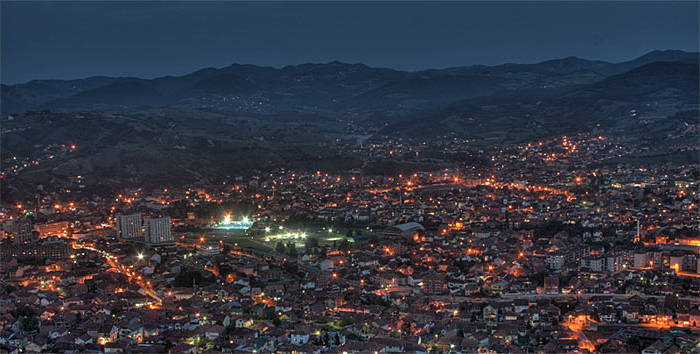
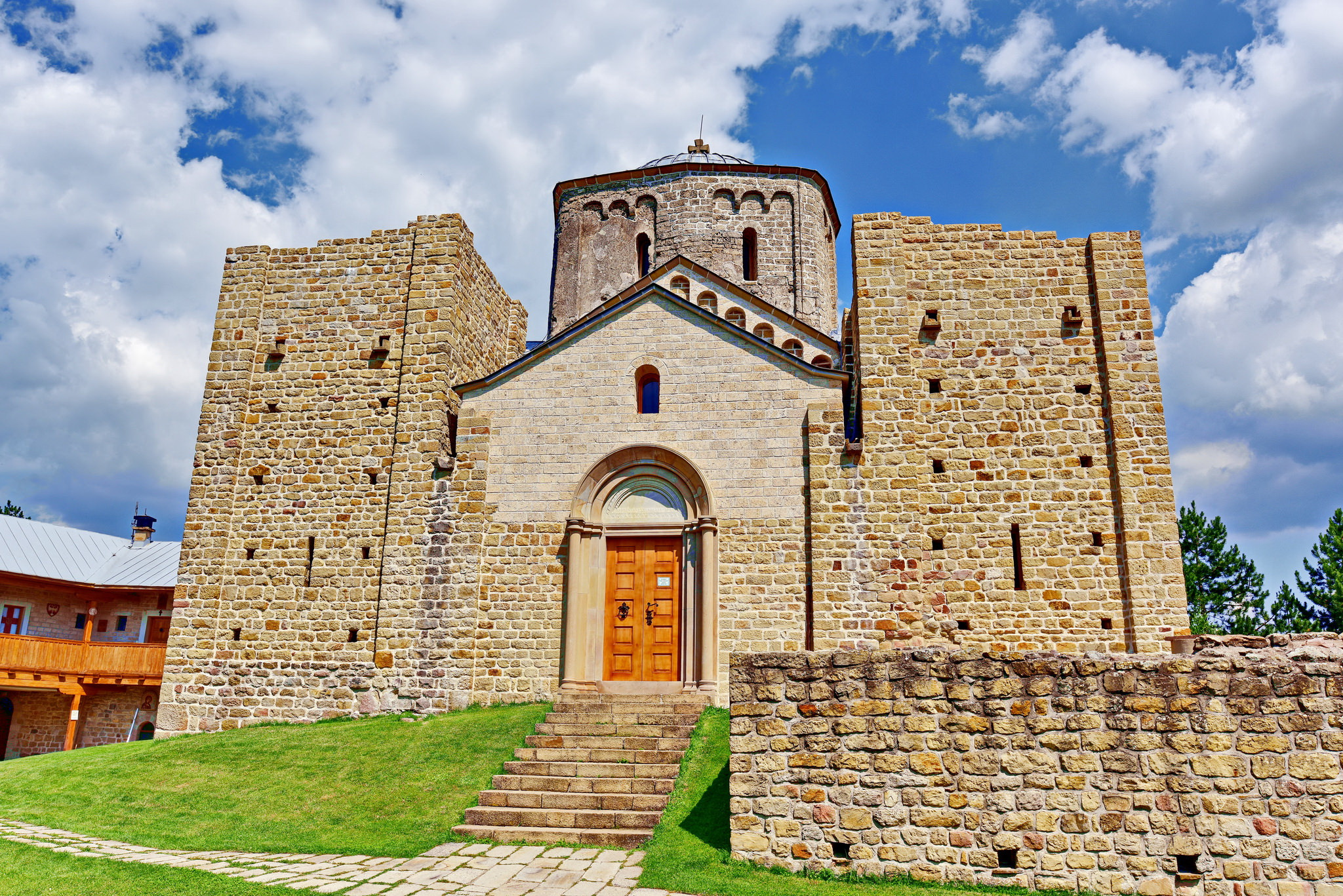
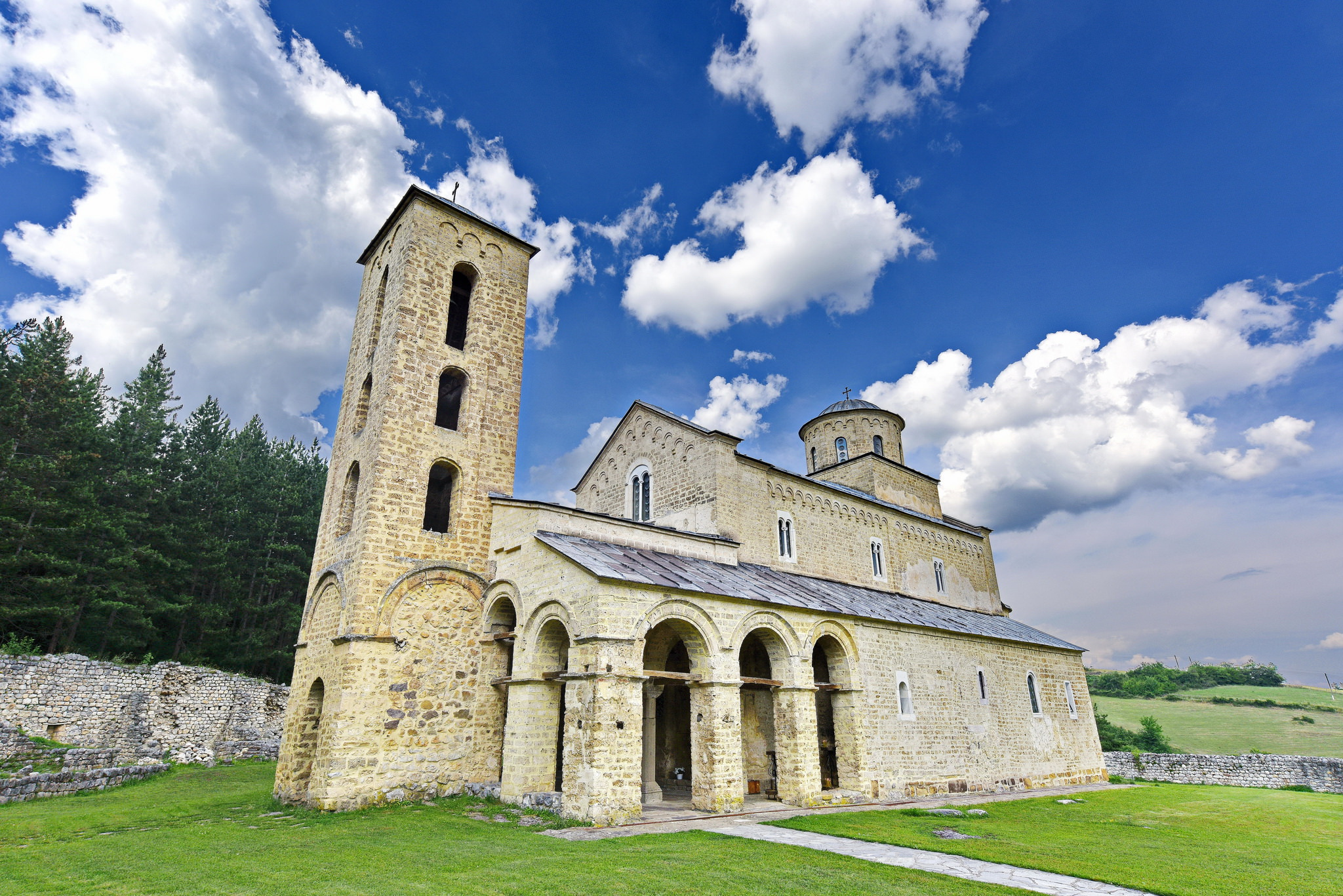
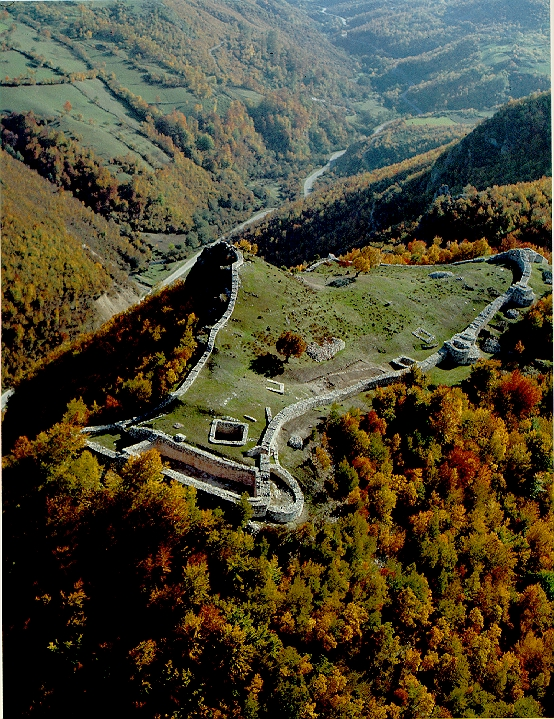
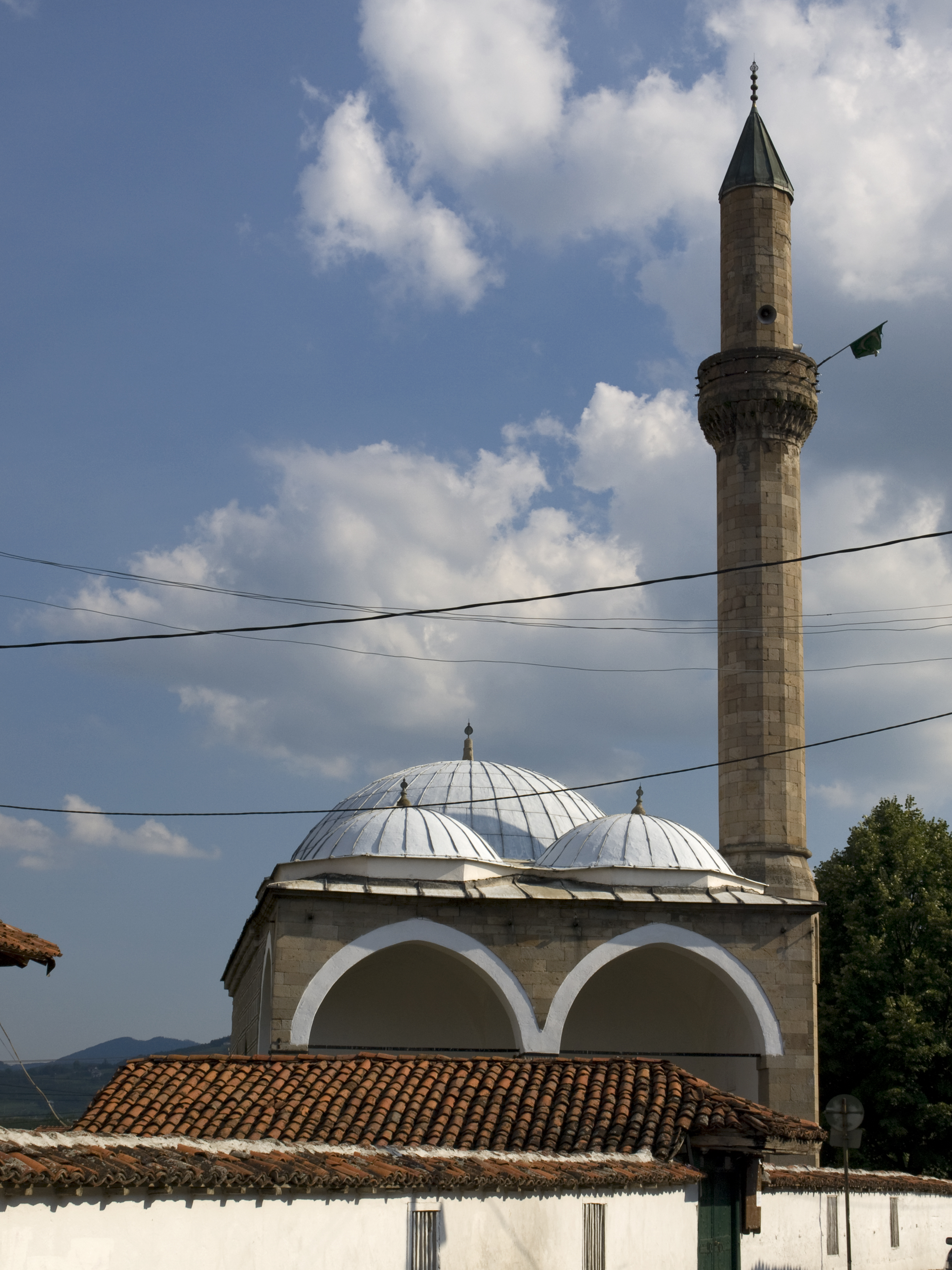
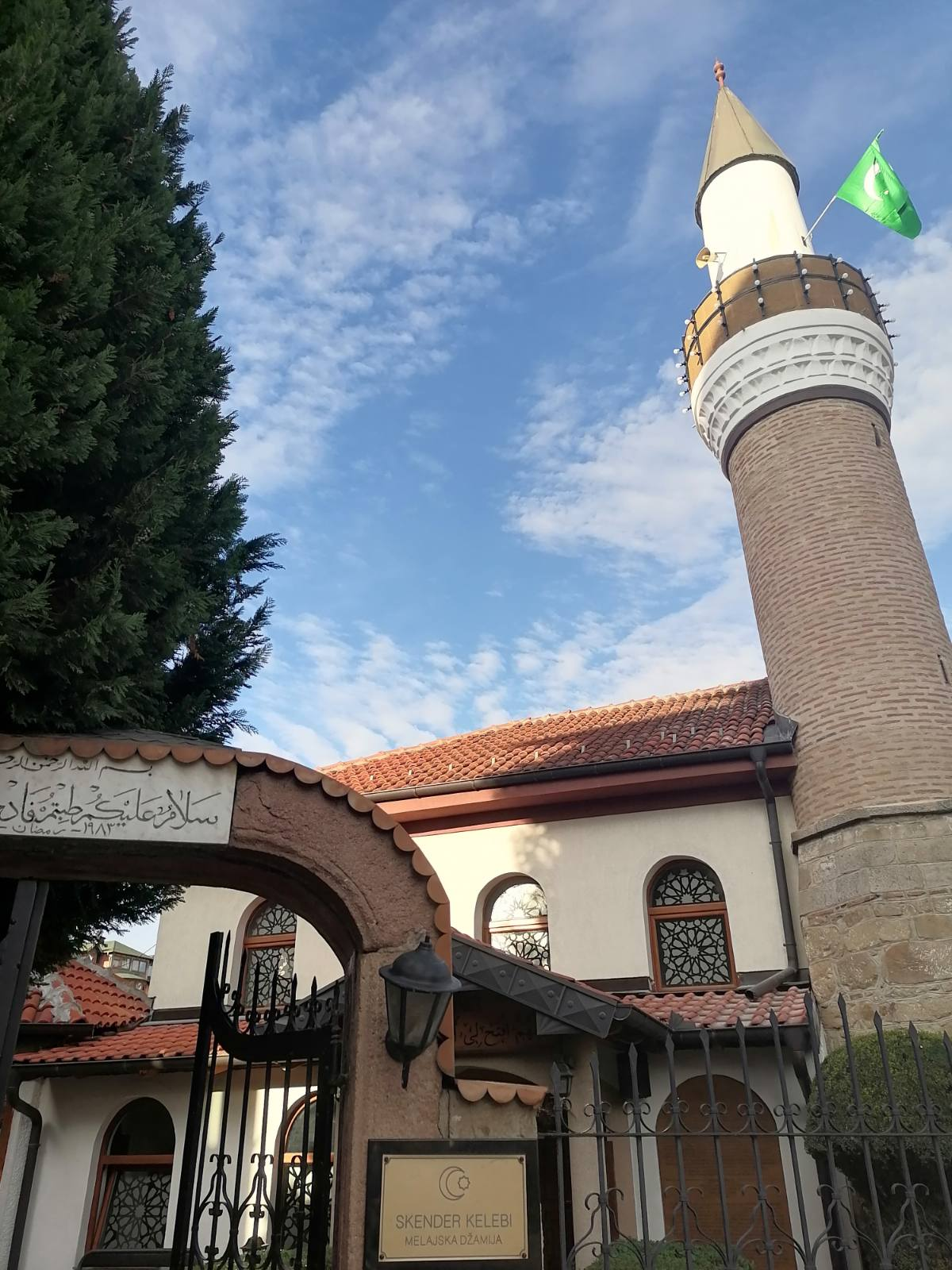
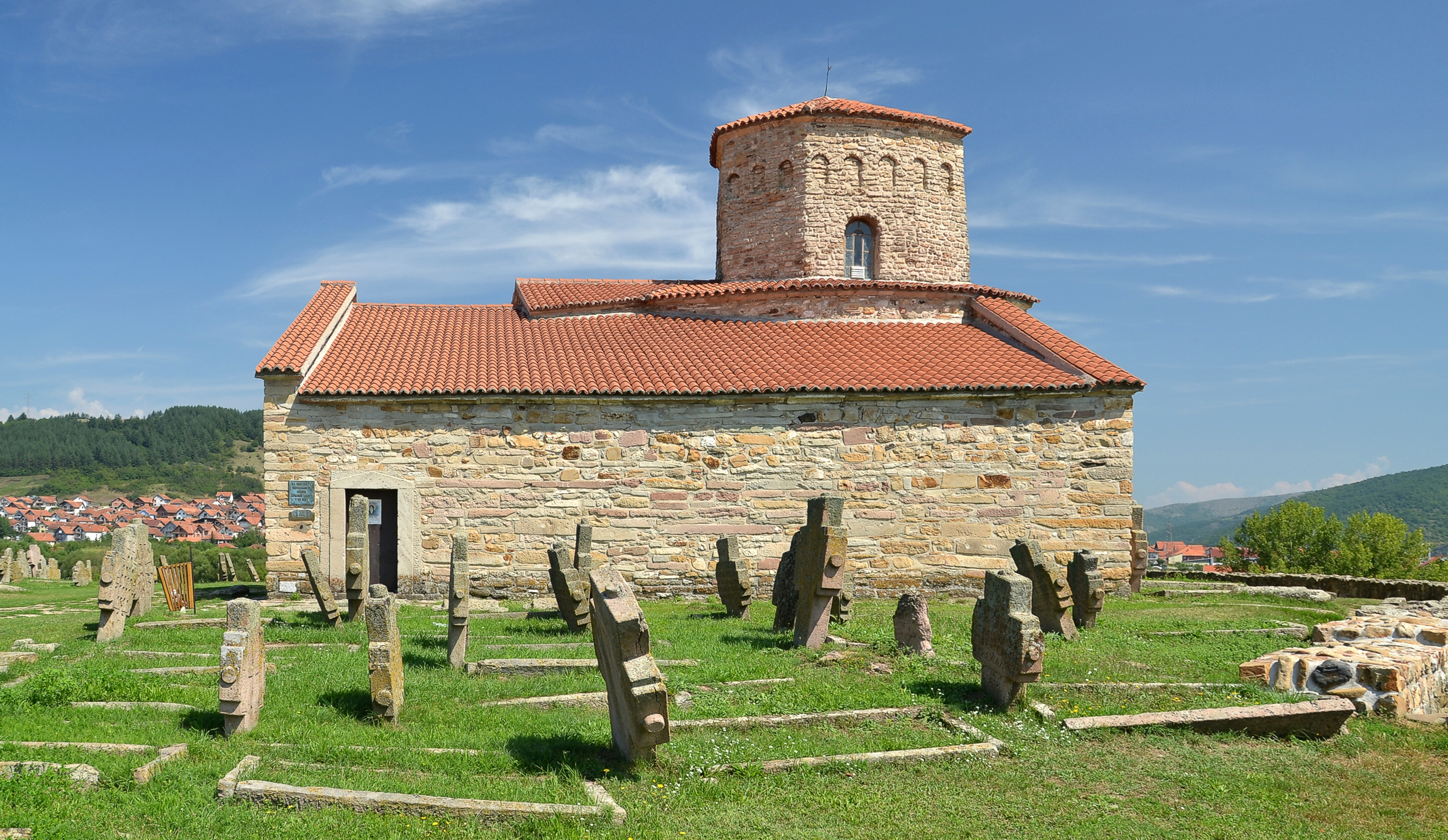
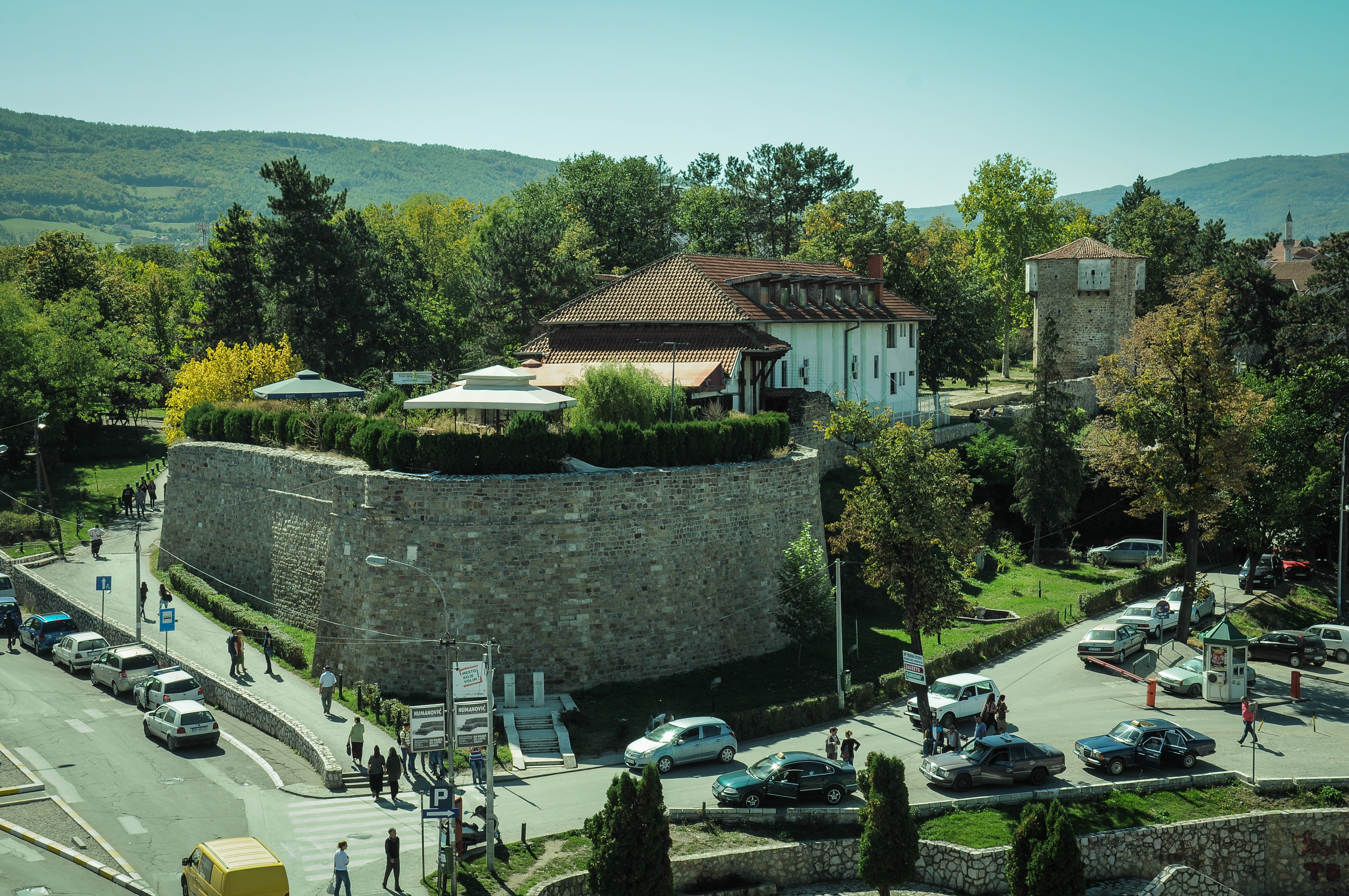
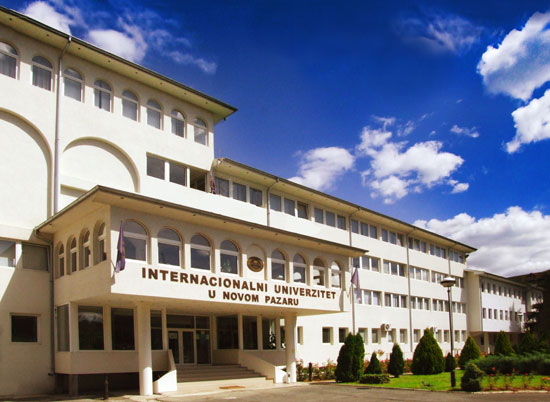
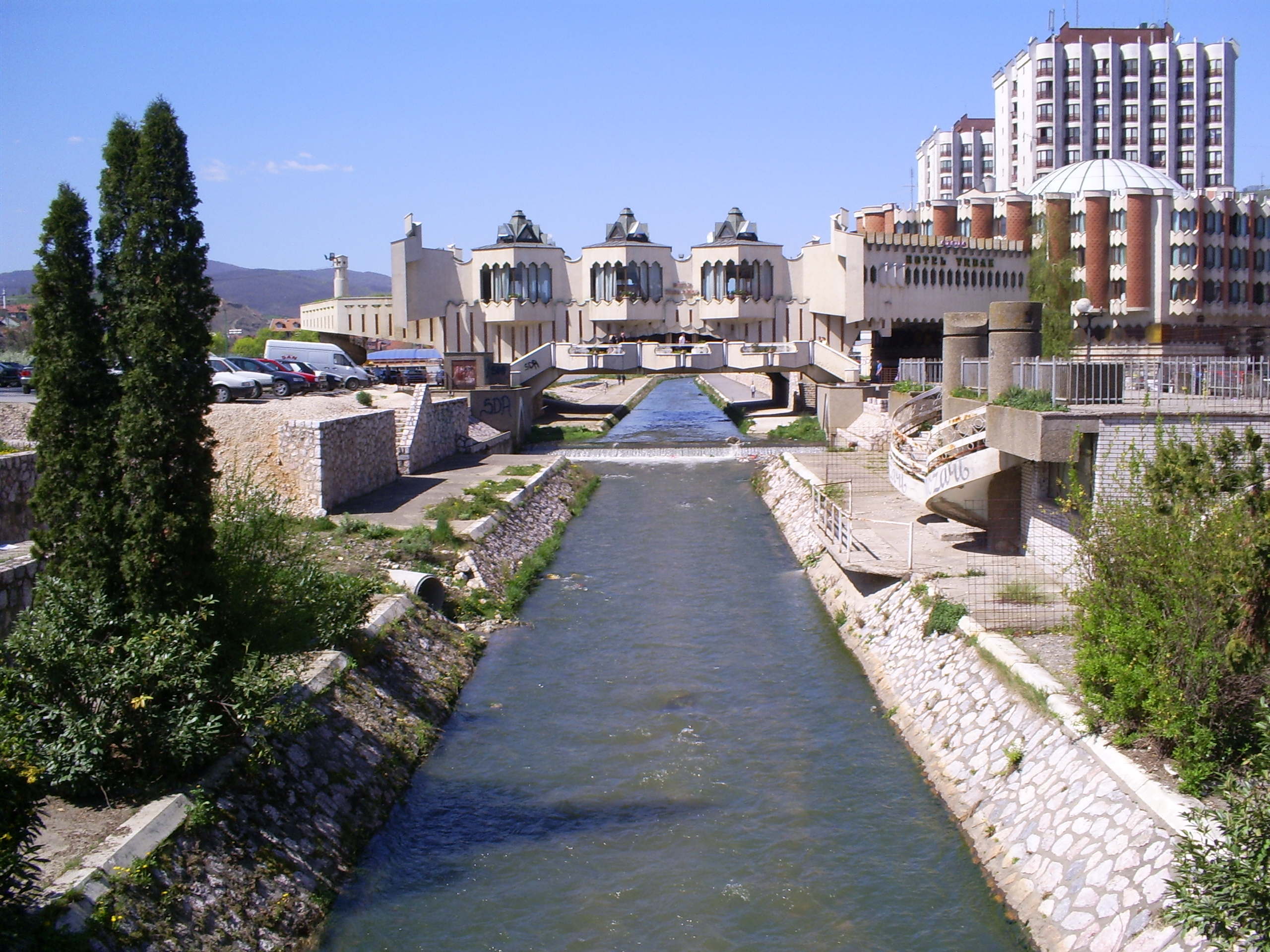
- Panorama of Novi Pazar at night Đurđevi Stupovi monastery Sopoćani monastery Stari Ras Altun-Alem Mosque Melajska Mosque Church of the Holy Apostles Peter and Paul Novi Pazar Fortress International University of Novi Pazar Raška river

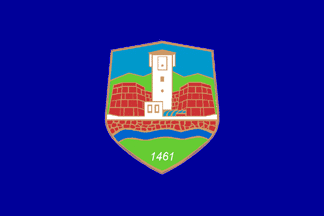
- Flag Coat of arms

- Location within Serbia Location within Europe Novi Pazar (Europe)
- Coordinates: 43°08′16″N 20°30′58″E
- Country: Serbia
- Region: Šumadija and Western Serbia
- District: Raška District
- Founded: 1461
- Settlements: 100

Government
  - Mayor: Nihat Biševac (SDP)

Area
  - Rank: 31st in Serbia
  - Urban: 15.34 km^{2} (5.92 sq mi)
  - Administrative: 742 km^{2} (286 sq mi)
- Elevation: 477 m (1,565 ft)

Population (2022 census)
  - Rank: 10th in Serbia
  - Urban: 71,462
  - Urban density: 4,659/km^{2} (12,070/sq mi)
  - Administrative: 106,720
  - Administrative density: 144/km^{2} (373/sq mi)
- Time zone: UTC+1 (CET)
  - Summer (DST): UTC+2 (CEST)
- Postal code: 36300; 36302; 36303; 36316; 36318; 36319; 36322
- Area code: +381(0)20
- ISO 3166 code: SRB
- Car plates: NP
- Official languages: Serbian together with Bosnian
- Climate: Cfb
- Website: www.novipazar.rs

Novi Pazar (Serbian Cyrillic: Нови Пазар) is a city located in the Raška District of southwestern Serbia. As of the 2022 census, the urban area has 71,462 inhabitants, while the city administrative area has 106,720 inhabitants. The city is the cultural center of the Bosniaks in Serbia and of Sandžak. A multicultural area of Muslims and Orthodox Christians, many monuments of both religions, like the Altun-Alem Mosque and the Church of the Holy Apostles Peter and Paul, are located in the region which has a total of 30 protected monuments of culture.

== Name ==
During the 14th century under the old Serbian fortress of Stari Ras, an important market-place named Trgovište started to develop. By the middle of the 15th century, in the time of the final Ottoman Empire conquest of Old Serbia, another market-place was developing some 11 km to the east. The older place became known as Staro Trgovište (Old Trgovište, Turkish: Eski Pazar) and the younger as Novo Trgovište (New Trgovište, Turkish: Yeni Pazar). The latter developed into the modern city of Novi Pazar.

The name "Novi Pazar" (meaning 'New Bazaar') was derived from the Serbian name Novo Trgovište, via the Turkish name Yeni Pazar, which is itself derived from bazaar (from Persian بازار (bāzār) 'market'; from Pahlavi بهاچار (bahā-chār) 'place of prices'). The city is known as Pazari i Ri or Tregu i Ri in Albanian and simply Novi Pazar in Bosnian. Aside from that it is still known as Yeni Pazar in modern-day Turkey.

== Geography ==
Novi Pazar is located in the valleys of the Jošanica, Raška, Deževska, and Ljudska rivers. It lies at an elevation of 496m, in the southeast Raška region. The city is surrounded by the Golija and Rogozna mountains, and the Pešter plateau lies to the west. The city's total administrative area is 742 km^{2}. It contains 100 settlements, mostly small and spread over hills and mountains surrounding the city. The largest village is Mur, with over 3000 residents.

=== Climate ===
Novi Pazar has a humid continental climate (Köppen climate classification: Dfb) typical of the hilly Raška region. It is generally cooler than Serbia's other major cities, though still significantly warmer than the neighboring town of Sjenica.

Climate data for Novi Pazar
Month	Jan	Feb	Mar	Apr	May	Jun	Jul	Aug	Sep	Oct	Nov	Dec	Year
Mean daily maximum °C (°F)	2.7 (36.9)	5.6 (42.1)	11.1 (52.0)	15.5 (59.9)	20.1 (68.2)	23.6 (74.5)	26.1 (79.0)	26.4 (79.5)	22.7 (72.9)	16.5 (61.7)	8.8 (47.8)	4.3 (39.7)	15.3 (59.5)
Daily mean °C (°F)	−0.6 (30.9)	1.6 (34.9)	6.3 (43.3)	10.2 (50.4)	14.6 (58.3)	18.0 (64.4)	20.1 (68.2)	20.1 (68.2)	16.7 (62.1)	11.4 (52.5)	5.2 (41.4)	1.2 (34.2)	10.4 (50.7)
Mean daily minimum °C (°F)	−3.9 (25.0)	−2.4 (27.7)	1.5 (34.7)	5.0 (41.0)	9.2 (48.6)	12.5 (54.5)	14.1 (57.4)	13.8 (56.8)	10.7 (51.3)	6.4 (43.5)	1.6 (34.9)	−1.8 (28.8)	5.6 (42.0)
Average precipitation mm (inches)	71 (2.8)	64 (2.5)	66 (2.6)	74 (2.9)	92 (3.6)	78 (3.1)	68 (2.7)	62 (2.4)	69 (2.7)	80 (3.1)	93 (3.7)	83 (3.3)	900 (35.4)

== History ==
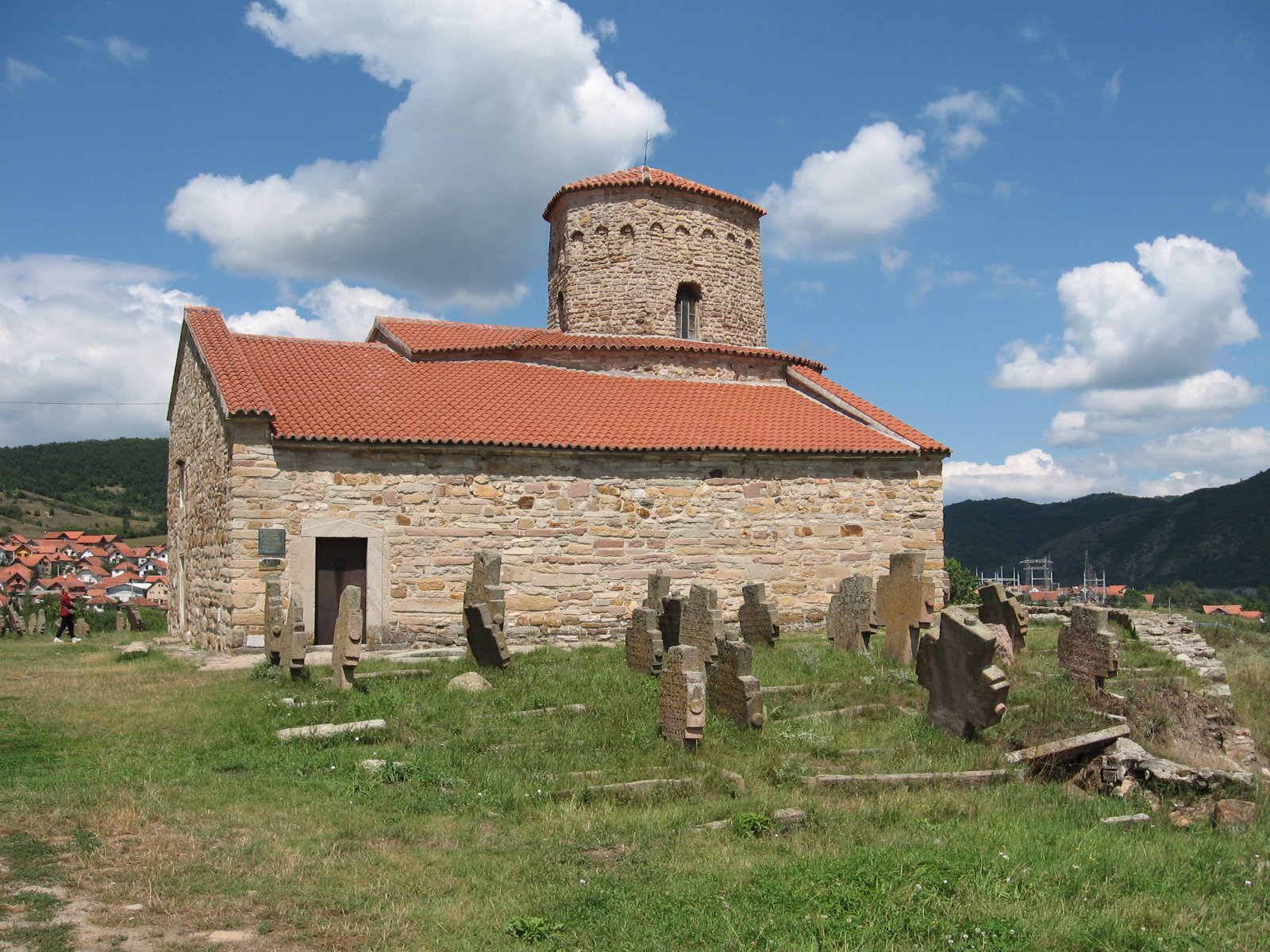
Church of the Holy Apostles Peter and Paul from the 9th century

One of the oldest monuments of the area is the Church of the Holy Apostles Peter and Paul first built in the Roman era and reconstructed in the 9th century. Over many centuries the city area of Stari Ras was a borderline contested by the First Bulgarian Empire, Serbian Principality and Byzantine Empire.

Since the late-12th century, the region of modern Novi Pazar served as the principal province of the Serbian realm. It was an administrative division, usually under the direct rule of the monarch and sometimes as an appanage. It was the crownland, seat or appanage of various Serbian states throughout the Middle Ages, including the Serbian Kingdom (1217–1345) and the Serbian Empire (1345–1371). In 1427, the region and the remnant of Ras, as part of the Serbian Despotate, was ruled by Serbian despot Đurađ Branković. One of the markets was called "despotov trg" (Despot's square). In 1439, the region was captured by the Ottoman Empire, but was reconquered by the Serbian Despotate in 1444. In the summer of 1455, the Ottomans conquered the region again, and named the settlement of Trgovište Eski Bazar (Old Market). Novi Pazar was formally founded as a city in its own right in 1461 by Ottoman general Isa-Beg Ishaković, the Bosnian governor of the district (sanjak) who also founded Sarajevo. Ishaković decided to establish a new town on the area of Trgovište as an urban center between Raška and Jošanica, where at first he built a mosque, a public bath, a marketplace, a hostel, and a compound.

The town was the capital of the Sanjak of Novi Pazar during Ottoman rule. From 1878 to 1908, it was controlled by Austria-Hungary, and from 1908 to 1913, it was again part of the Ottoman empire under the Kosovo vilayet. It became part of the Kingdom of Serbia during the First Balkan War in 1912, and then in 1918 the Kingdom of Yugoslavia.

The area has traditionally had a large number of Albanians and Muslim Slavs with a different culture from the Orthodox Serbs. In May 1901, Albanian bands pillaged and partially burned the cities of Novi Pazar, Sjenica and Prishtina. Albanians also massacred Serbs in the area of Ibar Kolašin. A contemporary report stated that when the Serb forces entered the Sandjak of Novi Pazar, they "pacified" the Albanians.

In the Battle for Novi Pazar, fought at the end of 1941 during the Second World War, the Chetniks, initially supported by the Partisans, unsuccessfully tried to capture the city. Following the overthrow of Slobodan Milošević on 5 October 2000, newly elected Prime Minister of Serbia Zoran Đinđić made considerable efforts to help economically the whole area of Novi Pazar. Also, with the help of Đinđić, the International University of Novi Pazar was founded in 2002. He made close relations with the leaders of Bosniaks, as part of his wider plan to reform Serbia. Twelve years following his assassination, the Novi Pazar Assembly decided to rename one street in his name.

== Demographics ==
Historical population
Year	Pop.	±%
1948	11,992	—
1953	14,104	+17.6%
1961	20,706	+46.8%
1971	28,950	+39.8%
1981	41,099	+42.0%
1991	51,749	+25.9%
2002	54,604	+5.5%
2011	66,527	+21.8%
2022	71,462	+7.4%

According to the 2022 census, the municipality of Novi Pazar has 106,720 inhabitants, while the city itself has 71,462 inhabitants. A total of 68.4% of population live in urban area of the city. The population density is 135.32 inhabitants per square kilometer. Novi Pazar has 23,022 households with 4,36 members on average; the number of homes is 28,688.

Religion structure in the city of Novi Pazar is predominantly Muslim (82,710), with Serbian Orthodox (16,051), Atheists (71), Catholics (51), and other minority groups. Most of the population speaks either Bosnian (74,501) or Serbian (23,406).

The composition of population by sex and average age:

- Male - 49,984 (32.9 years) and
- Female - 50,426 (34.1 years).

A total of 33,583 citizens (older than 15 years) have secondary education (44.4%), while the 7,351 citizens have higher education (9.7%). Of those with higher education, 5,005 (6.6%) have university education.

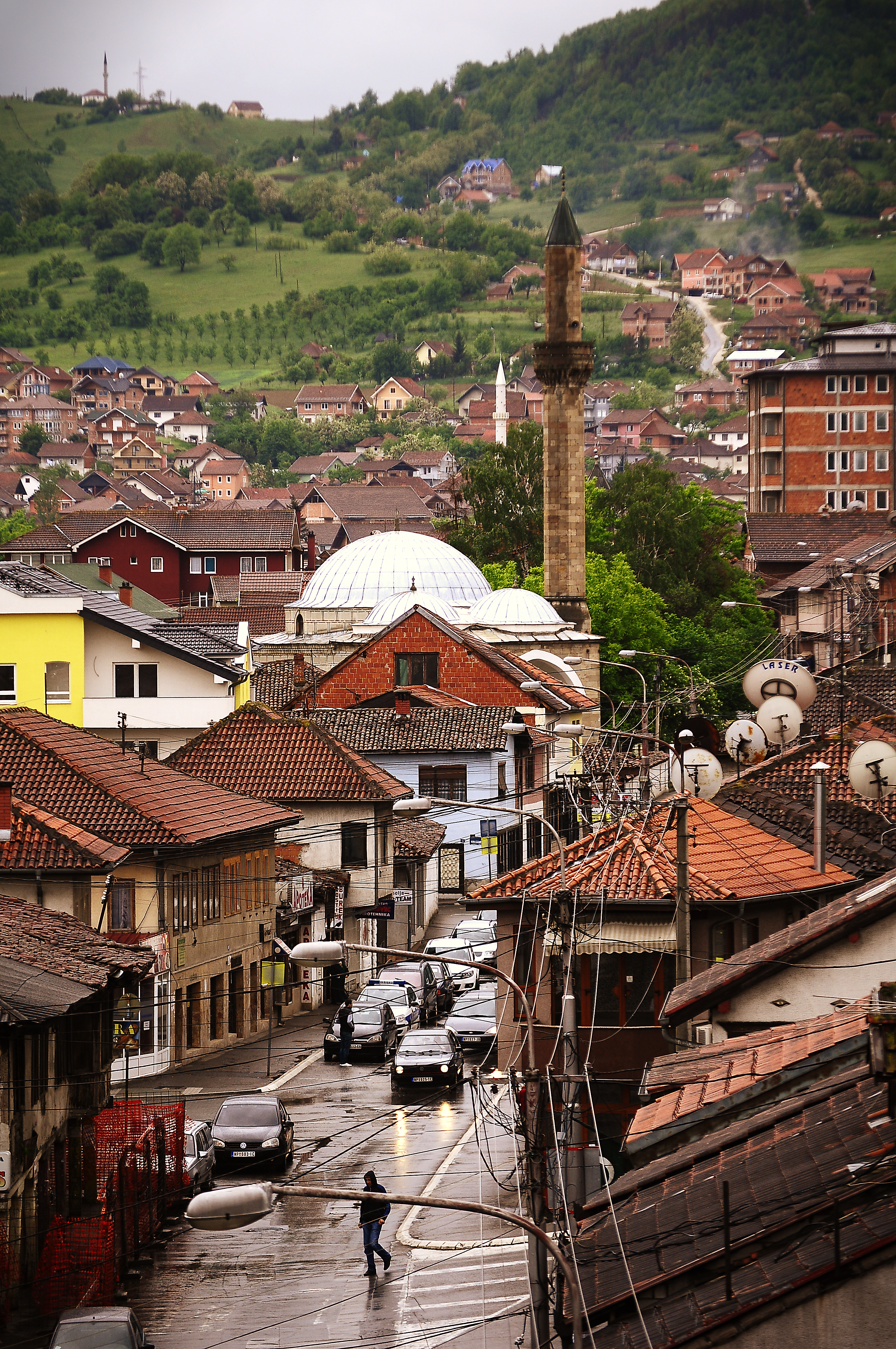
Prvomajska Street in Novi Pazar.

=== Ethnic composition ===
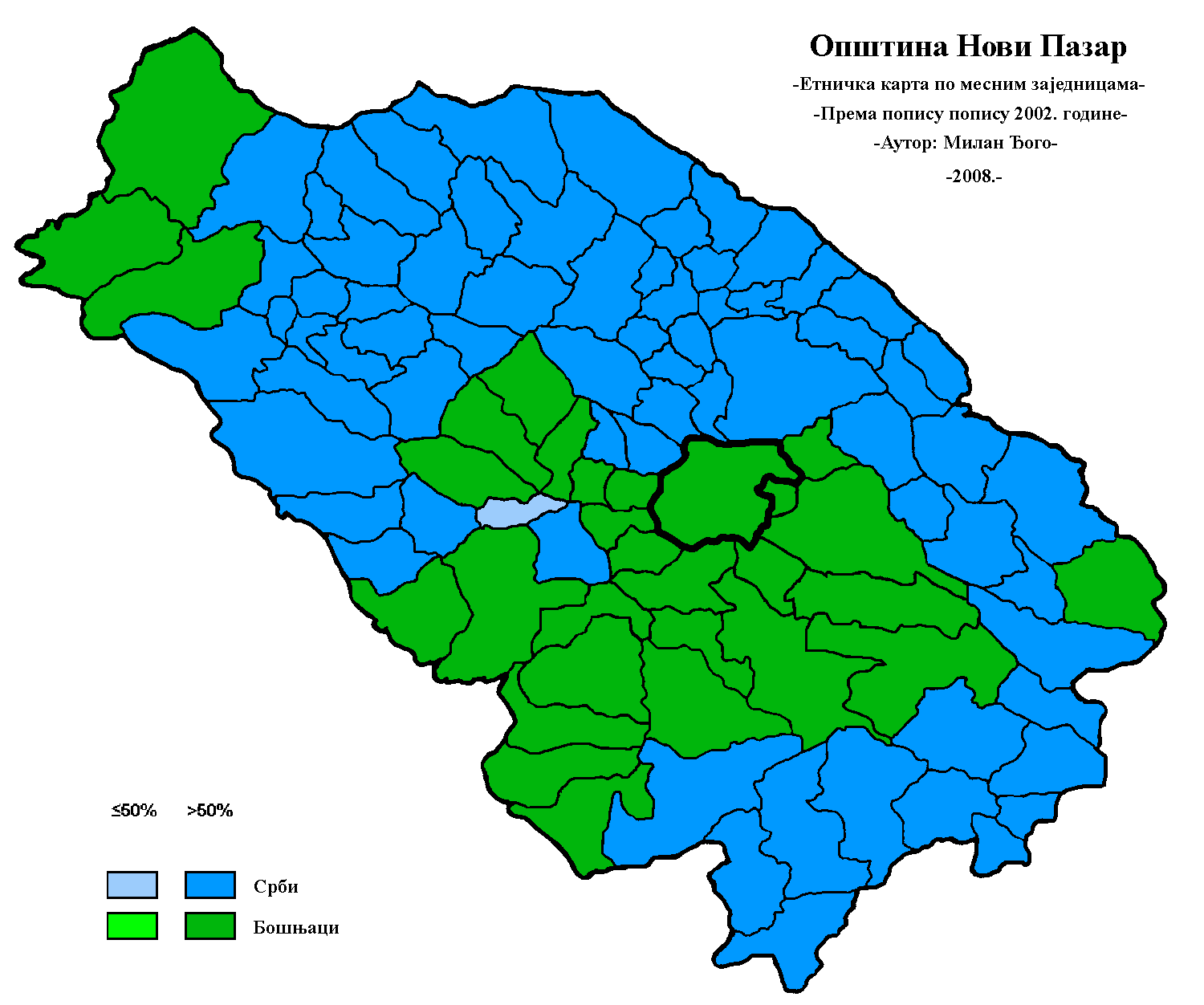
Ethnic composition of Novi Pazar settlements (2002 census)

From the 15th century to the Balkan Wars, Novi Pazar was the capital of the sanjak of Novi Pazar. Typically, like other centres of the wider area, its composition was multiethnic, with Albanians, Serbs and Slavic-speaking Muslims as the largest ethnic groups of the city. The Ottoman travel writer Evliya Çelebi noted that it was one of the most populated towns in the Balkans in the 17th century. Jews also lived in the city until World War II. The entire Jewish population of Novi Pazar - 221 individuals, were imprisoned, sent to the concentration camp Staro Sajmište and killed during the rule of Aćif Hadžiahmetović. The ethnic composition of the city administrative area:

Ethnic group	Population 1953	Population 1961	Population 1971	Population 1981	Population 1991	Population 2002	Population 2011	Population 2022
Bosniaks	-	-	-	-	-	65,593	81,545	85,204
Serbs	25,177	27,933	25,076	21,834	19,064	17,599	16,234	14,142
Muslims	-	23,250	37,140	49,769	64,251	1,599	-	1,851
Roma	-	37	210	444	334	69	566	486
Gorani	-	-	-	-	-	15	246	255
Albanians	144	126	307	233	209	129	202	200
Montenegrins	174	543	359	295	232	109	44	34
Yugoslavs	13,564	1,261	183	931	700	136	67	72
Turks	11,009	-	-	-	-	-	-	-
Others	263	5,627	1,057	494	459	747	4,476	161
Total	50,331	58,777	64,326	74,000	85,249	85,996	100,410	106,720

Ethnic composition of the urban area of the city:

Ethnic group	Population 1948	Population 1953	Population 1981	Population 1991	Population 2002	Population 2011	Population 2022
Bosniaks/Muslims	1,085	-	32,798	43,774	47,243	58,252	60,684
Serbs	10,678	3,466	6,689	6,698	6,724	6,576	6,067
Gorani	-	-	-	-	-	240	235
Albanians	-	134	208	172	120	162	158
Yugoslavs	-	5,944	848	570	105	64	68
Turks	-	4,280	-	-	-	-	-
Montenegrins	-	145	246	190	93	39	34
Others	229	135	310	345	1,541	3,304	4,217
Total	11,992	14,104	41,099	51,749	54,604	68,749	71,462

== Settlements ==
Aside from the urban area of Novi Pazar (54,604), the city administrative area includes the following settlements, with population from the 2002 census:

- Aluloviće (362)
- Bajevica (563)
- Banja (466)
- Bare (36)
- Batnjik (58)
- Bekova (116)
- Bele Vode (872)
- Boturovina (218)
- Brđani (195)
- Brestovo (5)
- Čašić Dolac (76)
- Cokoviće (20)
- Deževa (238)
- Dojinoviće (120)
- Dolac (87)
- Doljani (89)
- Dragočevo (112)
- Dramiće (80)
- Golice (64)
- Gornja Tušimlja (33)
- Goševo (50)
- Gračane (28)
- Građanoviće (19)
- Grubetiće (259)
- Hotkovo (193)
- Ivanča (813)
- Izbice (1,949)
- Jablanica (27)
- Janča (332)
- Javor (18)
- Jova (21)
- Kašalj (35)
- Koprivnica (12)
- Kosuriće (125)
- Kovačevo (243)
- Kožlje (618)
- Kruševo (486)
- Kuzmičevo (133)
- Leča (319)
- Lopužnje (70)
- Lukare (489)
- Lukarsko Goševo (850)
- Lukocrevo (186)
- Miščiće (231)
- Muhovo (545)
- Mur (3,407)
- Negotinac (26)
- Odojeviće (50)
- Oholje (179)
- Okose (36)
- Osaonica (284)
- Osoje (966)
- Paralovo (982)
- Pasji Potok (42)
- Pavlje (178)
- Pilareta (26)
- Pobrđe (2,176)
- Polokce (117)
- Pope (83)
- Postenje (3,471)
- Požega (523)
- Požežina (251)
- Prćenova (159)
- Pusta Tušimlja (53)
- Pustovlah (28)
- Radaljica (152)
- Rajčinoviće (537)
- Rajčinovićka Trnava (208)
- Rajetiće (63)
- Rajkoviće (29)
- Rakovac (21)
- Rast (51)
- Šaronje (398)
- Šavci (247)
- Sebečevo (897)
- Sitniče (778)
- Skukovo (23)
- Slatina (297)
- Smilov Laz (8)
- Srednja Tušimlja (40)
- Štitare (77)
- Stradovo (19)
- Sudsko Selo (87)
- Tenkovo (89)
- Trnava (694)
- Tunovo (128)
- Varevo (501)
- Vever (18)
- Vidovo (90)
- Vitkoviće (30)
- Vojkoviće (36)
- Vojniće (115)
- Vranovina (329)
- Vučiniće (245)
- Vučja Lokva (15)
- Zabrđe (49)
- Zlatare (12)
- Žunjeviće (211)

== Politics ==
Novi Pazar is governed by a city assembly composed of 47 councillors, a mayor and vice-mayor. After the last legislative election held in 2020, the local assembly is composed of the following groups:

- SDP - European Novi Pazar - Rasim Ljajić (21)
- SPP - Muamer Zukorlić (11)
- SDA - Party of Democratic Action of Sandžak (9)
- Aleksandar Vučić - SNS, SPS, SRS (6)

== Economy ==
Lying on crossroads between numerous old and new states, Novi Pazar has always been a strong trade center. Along with the trade, the city developed manufacturing tradition. During the 20th century, it became a center of textile industry.

Paradoxically, during the turbulent 1990s and, Novi Pazar prospered, even during the UN sanctions, boosted by the strong private initiative in textile industry. Jeans of Novi Pazar, first of forged trademarks, and later on its own labels, became famous throughout the region. However, during the relative economic prosperity in Serbia of the 2000s, the Novi Pazar economy collapsed, with demise of large textile combines in mismanaged privatization, and incoming competition from the import.

As of 2023, Novi Pazar was having around 23,000 unemployed inhabitants, making it one of the cities in Serbia with the highest unemployment rate (around 50%). Some of the main reasons for this was unstable political situation during the 1990s and 2000s, and underdeveloped infrastructure (with no international airports, motorways and railways nearby).

Economic figures

The following table gives a preview of total number of registered people employed in legal entities per their core activity (as of 2022):

Activity	Total
Agriculture, forestry and fishing	72
Mining and quarrying	13
Manufacturing	3,173
Electricity, gas, steam and air conditioning supply	144
Water supply; sewerage, waste management and remediation activities	497
Construction	1,957
Wholesale and retail trade, repair of motor vehicles and motorcycles	3,902
Transportation and storage	1,717
Accommodation and food services	924
Information and communication	198
Financial and insurance activities	216
Real estate activities	8
Professional, scientific and technical activities	634
Administrative and support service activities	186
Public administration and defense; compulsory social security	1,404
Education	2,741
Human health and social work activities	1,806
Arts, entertainment and recreation	276
Other service activities	633
Individual agricultural workers	441
Total	20,944

== Society and culture ==
=== Monuments ===
The old Serbian Orthodox monastery of Sopoćani, the foundation of St King Uroš I, built in the second half of the 13th century and located west of Novi Pazar, is a World Heritage Site since 1979 accompanying with Stari Ras (Old Ras), a medieval capital of the Serbian great župan Stefan Nemanja.

The city also houses the oldest intact church in Serbia and one of the oldest ones in the region which dates from the 9th-century, the Church of St Peter. The church's walls were defaced with graffiti on 6 April 2008. The police have not officially concluded why the incident occurred.

On a hilltop overlooking Novi Pazar is the 12th-century monastery of Đurđevi stupovi, long left in ruin, but recently restored and with a monastic community using it, with plate glass to keep out the weather and preserve the fine frescos. The main mosque of the city, the Altun-Alem Mosque, was built in the first half of the 16th century by architect Abdul Gani.

There are various other historic Ottoman buildings, such as the 17th-century Amir-agin Han, a 15th-century Hammam, and the 15th-century Turkish fortress (all gone but the walls, the site of which is now a walled park in the city centre).

=== Education ===
Faculty for Islamic studies in Novi Pazar

Novi Pazar is home to two universities, the International University of Novi Pazar and the State University of Novi Pazar.

=== Sport ===
The city's football club FK Novi Pazar was founded in 1928, under the name "FK Sandžak", which later changed to "FK Deževa". The club has played under its current name since 1962, when Deževa and another local football club, FK Ras, unified under this name. The club was a SFRJ amateur champion, and a member of the Yugoslav Second League. FK Novi Pazar qualified for a promotional play-off twice, but lost both times (to FK Sutjeska Nikšić in 1994, and to FK Sloboda Užice in 1995). FK Novi Pazar finally promoted to Serbian SuperLiga in 2011–12 season. FK Novi Pazar is the oldest second-league team in Serbia. Football is still an extremely popular sport in Novi Pazar and the city stadium is always full.

Volleyball clubs in the city are OK Novi Pazar (first league) and OK Koteks.

The Handball club is in the second league and used to have the name "Ras" but it was changed to RK Novi Pazar in 2004.

The Basketball club of the city is OKK Novi Pazar.

Famous athletes from the city include Turkish basketball national team player Mirsad Jahović Türkcan, former football player of Besiktas Sead Halilagić, handball-player Mirsad Terzić (who represents Bosnia and Herzegovina) and young football players Adem Ljajić, Ediz Bahtiyaroğlu, Armin Đerlek.

== International cooperation ==
List of Novi Pazar's sister and twin cities:

- Shusha, Azerbaijan
- Bayrampaşa, Turkey
- Jagodina, Serbia
- Karatay, Turkey
- Kocaeli Province, Turkey
- Novi Pazar, Bulgaria
- Pendik, Turkey
- Vranje, Serbia
- Yalova, Turkey

Other friendships and cooperations, protocols, memorandums:

- Goražde, Bosnia and Herzegovina
- Ilidža, Bosnia and Herzegovina
- Podgorica, Montenegro
- Sarajevo, Bosnia and Herzegovina
- Sombor, Serbia
- Damietta, Egypt

== Gallery ==
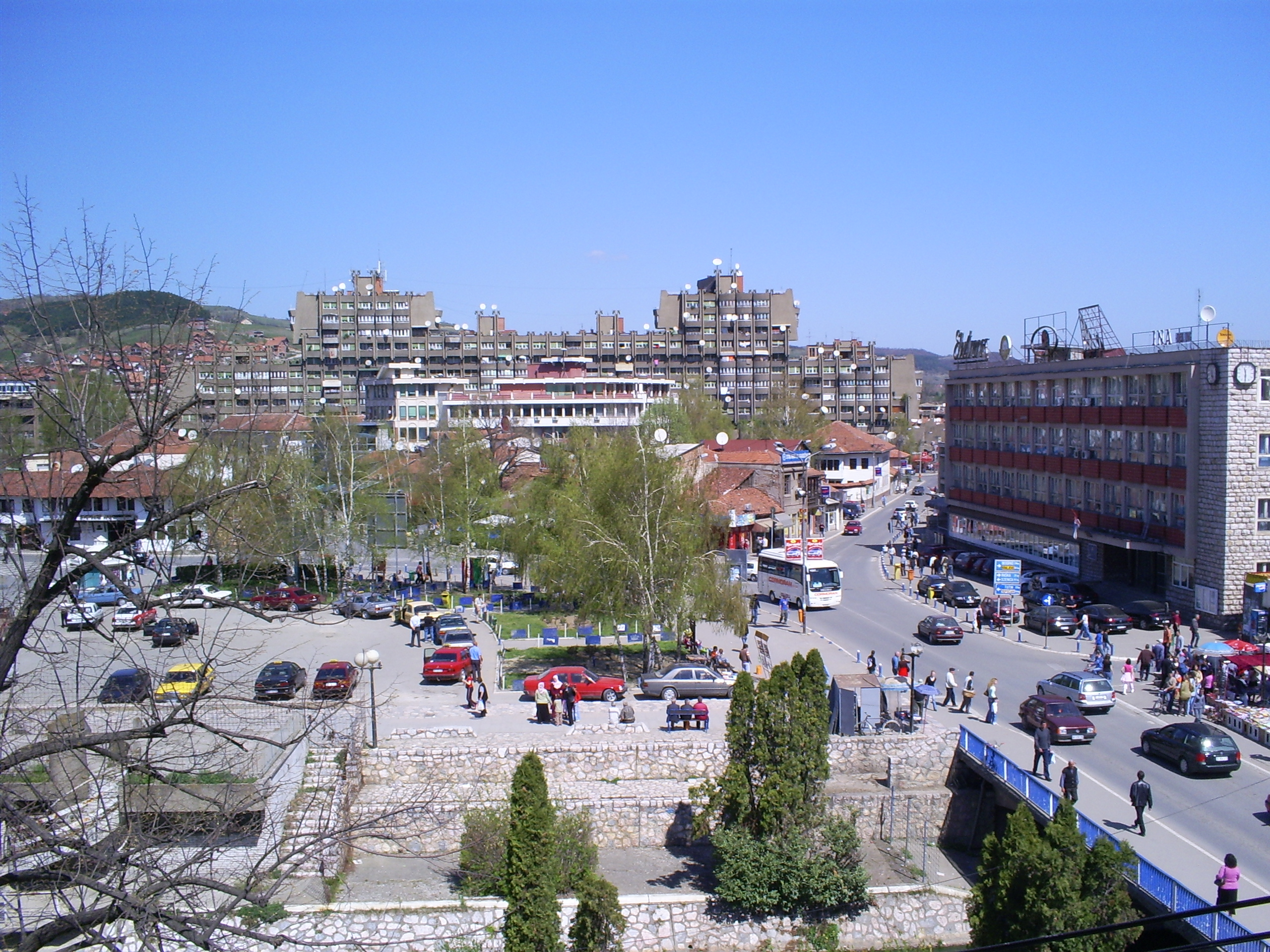
Novi Pazar city center

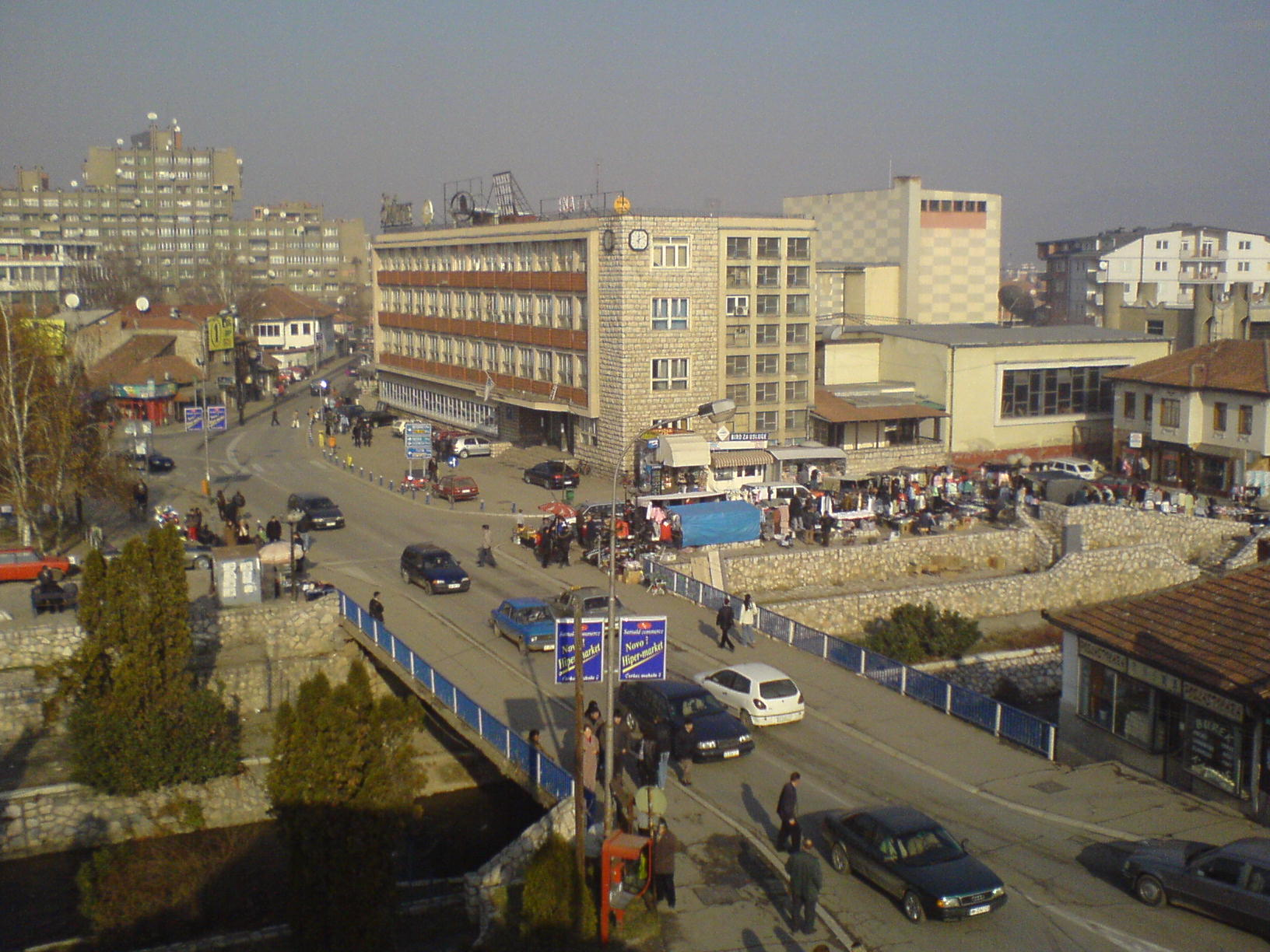
Novi Pazar city center

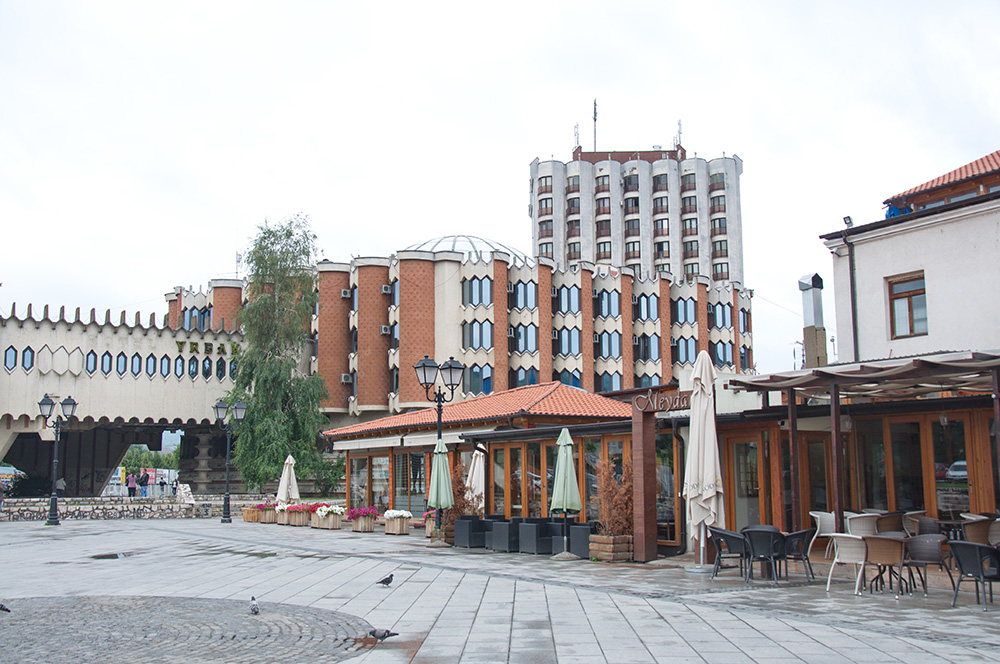
Novi Pazar city center

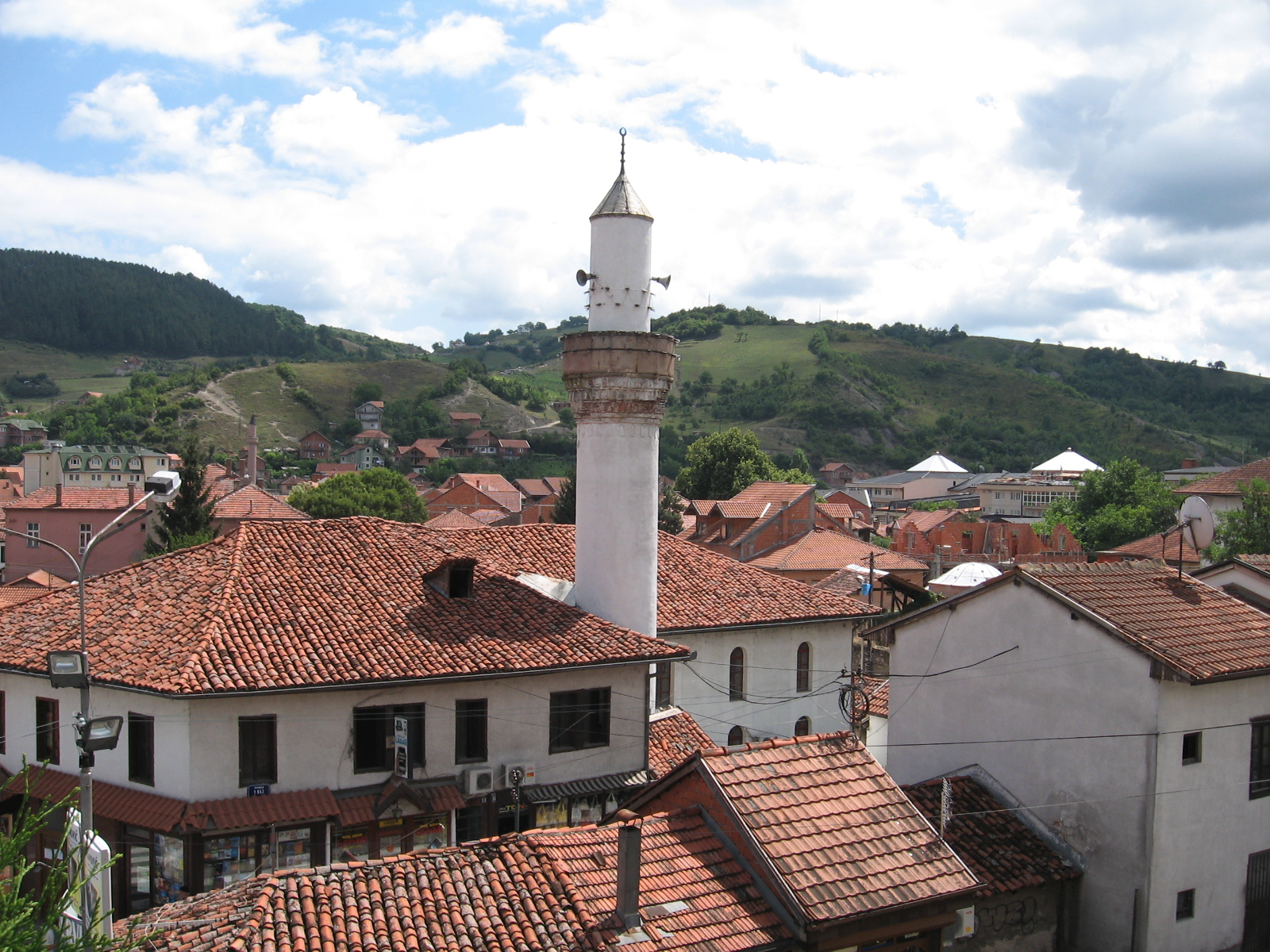
Novi Pazar Mosque in the neighborhood

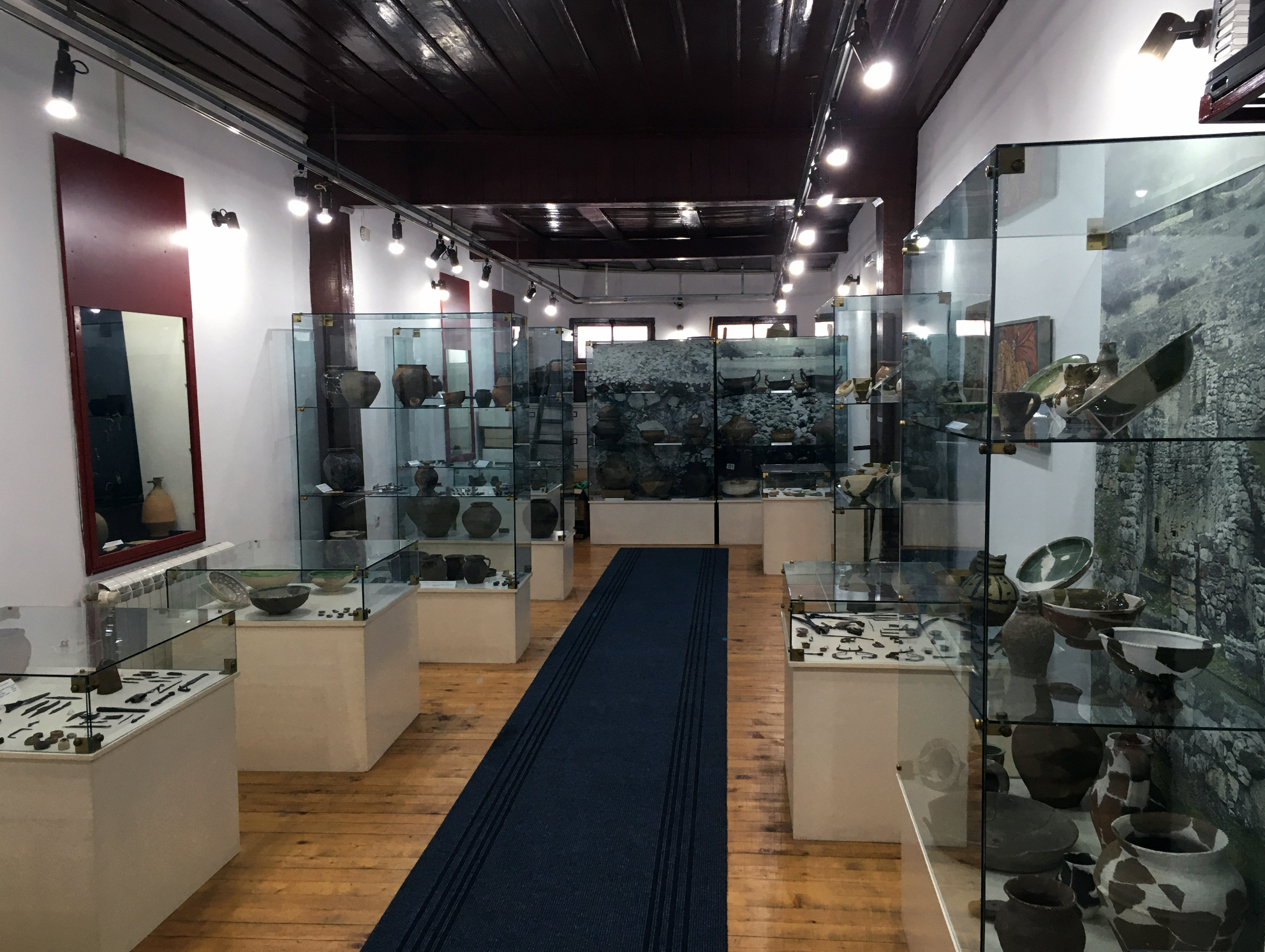
Archeological artifacts, Museum of Ras

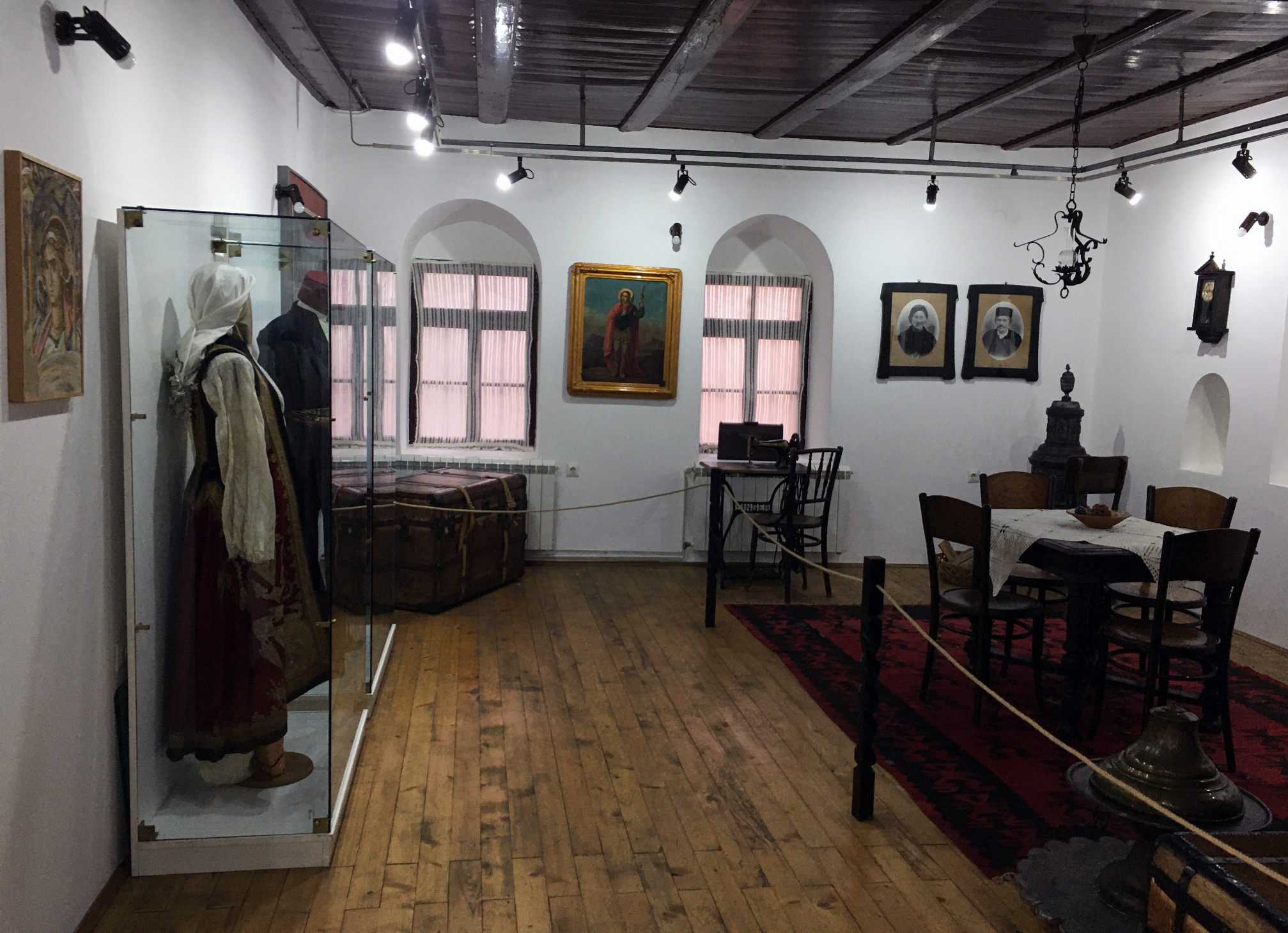
Serbian household from the 19th and early 20th century, Museum of Ras

== Notable people ==
- Samuilo Jakovljević (1760–1825), Orthodox clergyman and Serbian diplomatic envoy
- Tahir Efendi Jakova (1770–1850), Albanian poet
- Aćif Hadžiahmetović (1887–1945), politician, mayor of Novi Pazar during Second World War
- Milunka Savić (1888–1973), the most-decorated female combatant in the entire history of warfare
- Abdulah Gegić (1924–2008), former Partizan Belgrade football coach
- Ejup Ganić (b. 1946), engineer and politician
- Laza Ristovski (1956–2007), Yugoslav keyboardist, member of Smak and Bijelo Dugme
- Rasim Ljajić (b. 1964), politician
- Muamer Zukorlić (1970–2021), politician and Islamic theologian
- Mirsad Jahović Türkcan (b. 1976), Turkish basketball player
- Emina Jahović (b. 1982), pop singer
- Miljan Mutavdžić (b. 1986), football player
- Adem Ljajić (b. 1991), football player
- Amela Terzić (b. 1993), runner
- Erhan Mašović (b. 1998), football player
- Hamad Medjedovic (b. 2003), tennis player
- Hena Kurtagić (b. 2004), volleyball player
- Asim Đulović (b. 2005), basketball player
