= Sitniče =

Sitniče Ситниче
- Village (Selo)
- Location within Serbia
- Coordinates: 43°10′N 20°25′E
- Country: Serbia
- Time zone: UTC+1 (CET)
  - Summer (DST): UTC+2 (CEST)

Sitniče (Serbian: Ситниче) is a village on the west side of the municipality of Novi Pazar, Serbia.

As of 2022, its population was 908, all of whom are Bosniaks.
