= Church of the Sacred Heart of Jesus, Futog =

Church of the Sacred Heart of Jesus
- Serbo-Croatian: Crkva srca Isusovog
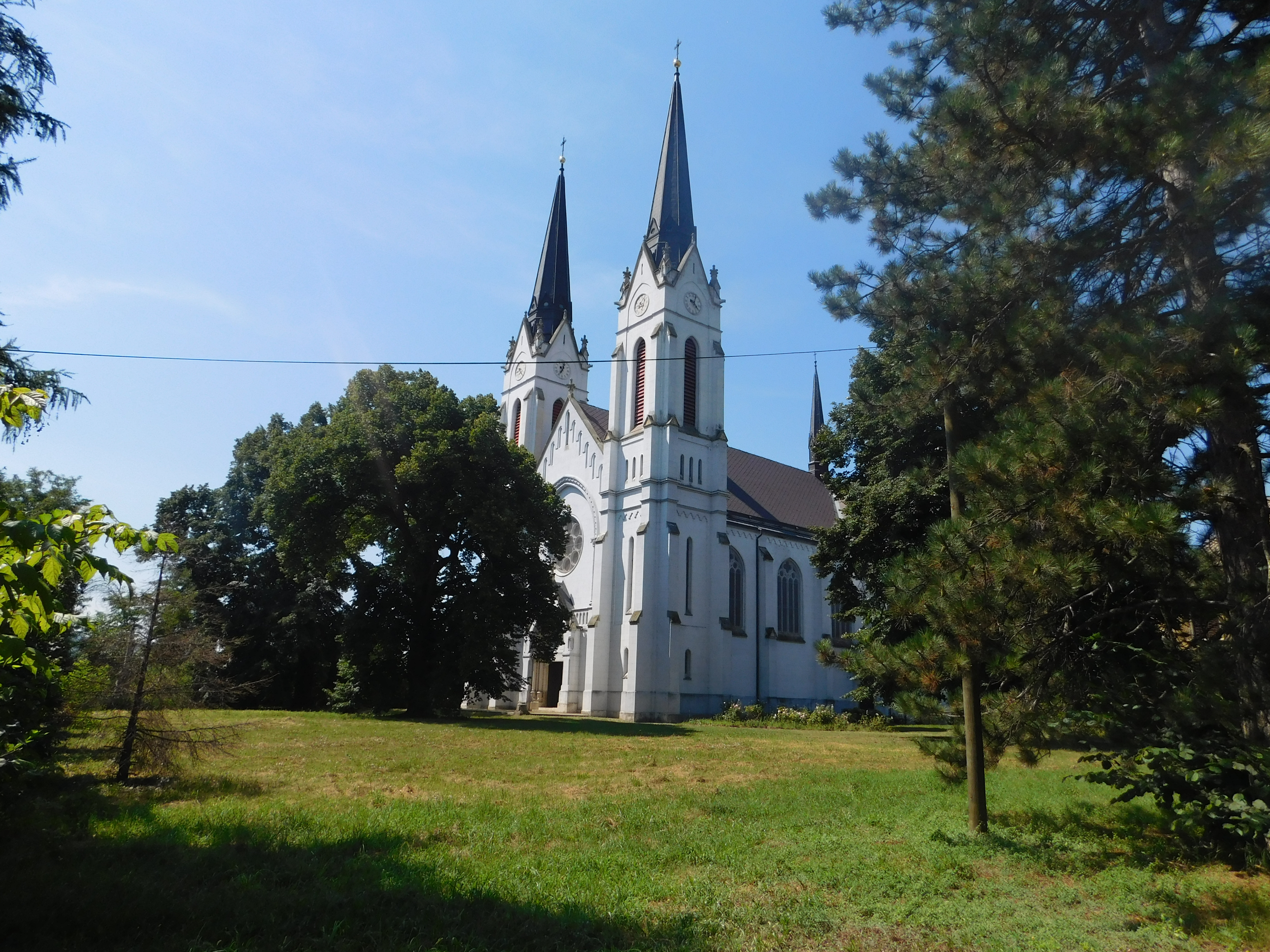
- View of the Church of the Sacred Heart of Jesus
- Church of the Sacred Heart of Jesus
- 45°14′17″N 19°41′51″E
- Location: Futog, Vojvodina
- Country: Serbia
- Denomination: Roman Catholic

History
- Status: Church
- Dedication: Sacred Heart of Jesus

Architecture
- Functional status: Active
- Heritage designation: SK 1155
- Architectural type: Gothic Revival
- Completed: 1908

Administration
- Archdiocese: Roman Catholic Diocese of Subotica

Church of the Sacred Heart of Jesus (Serbo-Croatian: Crkva srca Isusovog) is a Roman Catholic church located in Futog, suburb of Vojvodina's capital Novi Sad, Serbia. The building was completed in period between 1906 and 1908. Count András Hadik de Futak built the original church at the same site already in 1776. Countess Kotek asked architect Ferenc Weninger to design the new building in style of Gothic Revival while the old building was demolished. The building is listed as a part of Immovable Cultural Heritage of Great Importance.

== See also ==
- Church of St. Cosmas and Damian, Futog
