= Church of Sts. Cosmas and Damian, Futog =

Church in Futog, Serbia

Church of Sts. Cosmas and Damian
- Црква Светих Врачева Кузме и Дамјана
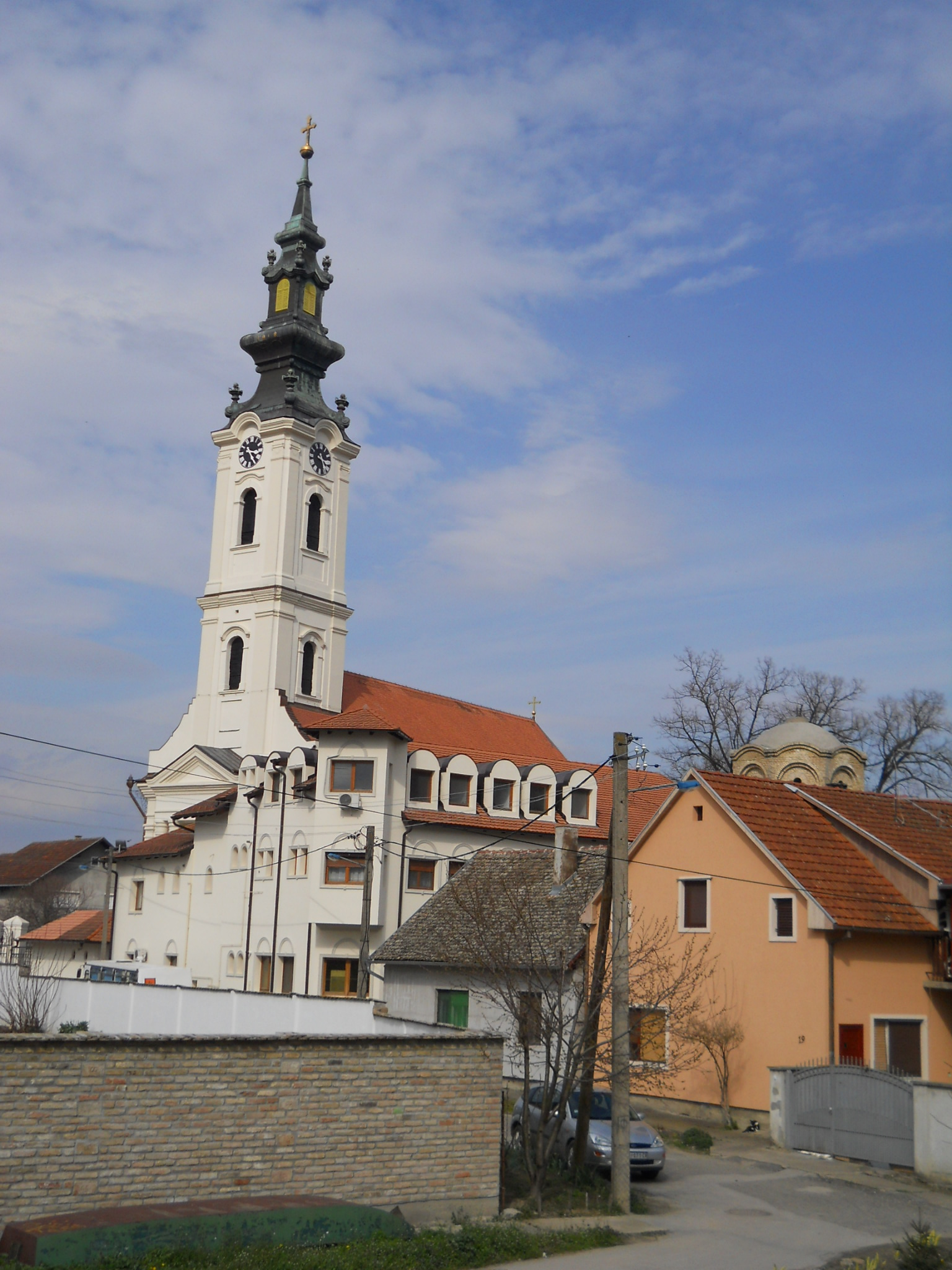
- Church of St. Cosmas and Damian
- Church of Sts. Cosmas and Damian
- 45°14′09″N 19°43′15″E
- Location: Vojvodina, Futog

Cultural Heritage of Serbia
- Type: Cultural Monument of Great Importance
- Designated: 10 November 1997
- Reference no.: СК 1157
- Country: Serbia
- Denomination: Serbian Orthodox

History
- Dedication: Cosmas and Damian
- Consecrated: 1776

Architecture
- Style: Baroque and Classicism

Administration
- Archdiocese: Eparchy of Bačka

The Church of Sts. Cosmas and Damian in Futog, suburb of Novi Sad, is a Serbian Orthodox church in Vojvodina, Serbia. The church is dedicated to saint Cosmas and Damian. The church is the only one in the Eparchy of Bačka dedicated to Saints Cosmas and Damian.

== History ==
After the retreat of the Ottoman Empire from Bačka region religious life among the Serbs revived in the late 17th century. A 1696 Viennese engraving of Futog depicts a large church dedicated to Saints Cosmas and Damian, built in the Romanesque style with a high tower and a spacious courtyard. During the Austro-Turkish War (1716–1718), the relics of Saint Prince Lazar of Serbia were kept in the church as recorded by historian Ljubomir Stojanović.

The construction of the new church officially began on September 18, 1776, as noted in the Moscow Gospel, a book brought to Futog in 1734. However, first proposals to build the new church had started as early as 1747.

The iconostasis of the church was painted by Arsenije Teodorović in 1799. During the Hungarian Revolution of 1848 Hungarian soldiers burned part of the iconostasis along with church archives. During World War I, Austro-Hungarian authorities confiscated three out of four bells for wartime use, with replacements arriving in 1922 after the establishment of the Kingdom of Serbs, Croats and Slovenes.

== Cultural protection ==
The building was registered in the central register of the Republic of Serbia on November 10, 1997 (SK 1157) and in the local register on October 28, 1997 (No. 25). Its preservation falls under the jurisdiction of the Institute for the Protection of Cultural Monuments of Novi Sad. The registration was based on the decision of the Vojvodina Provincial Institute for the Protection of Cultural Monuments (No. 01-247/1-72) issued on March 13, 1972, with its classification officially confirmed in the Official Gazette (Sl. list APV 28/91).

== See also ==
- Church of the Sacred Heart of Jesus, Futog
