= Futog =

Futog Футог (Serbian) Futak
- Suburban settlement
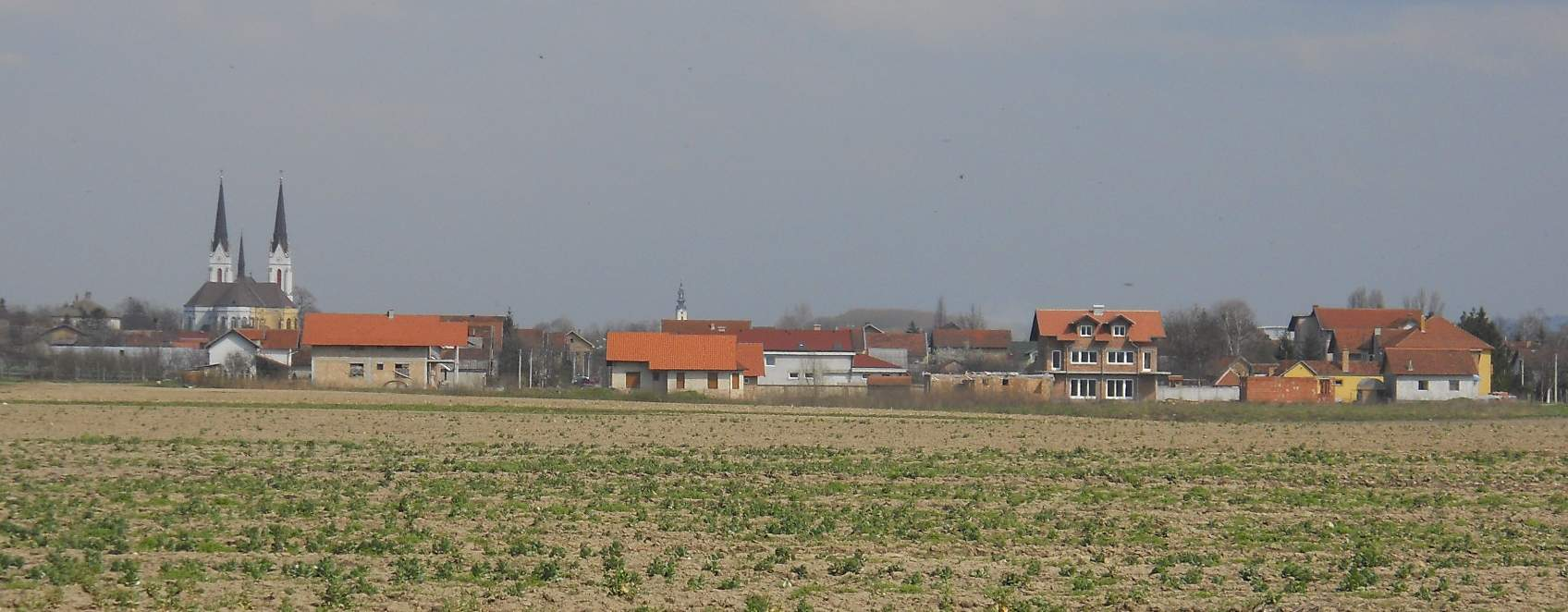
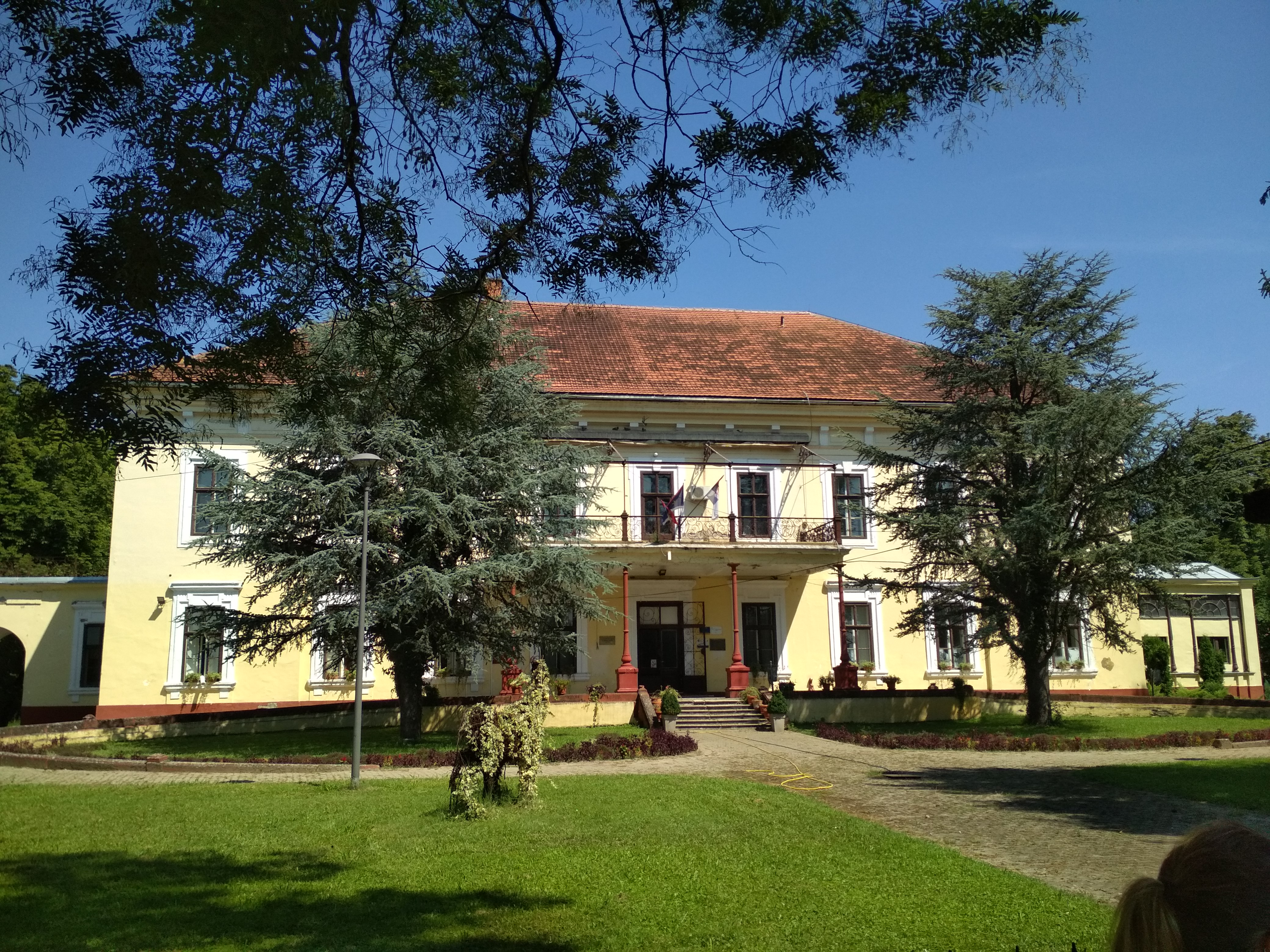
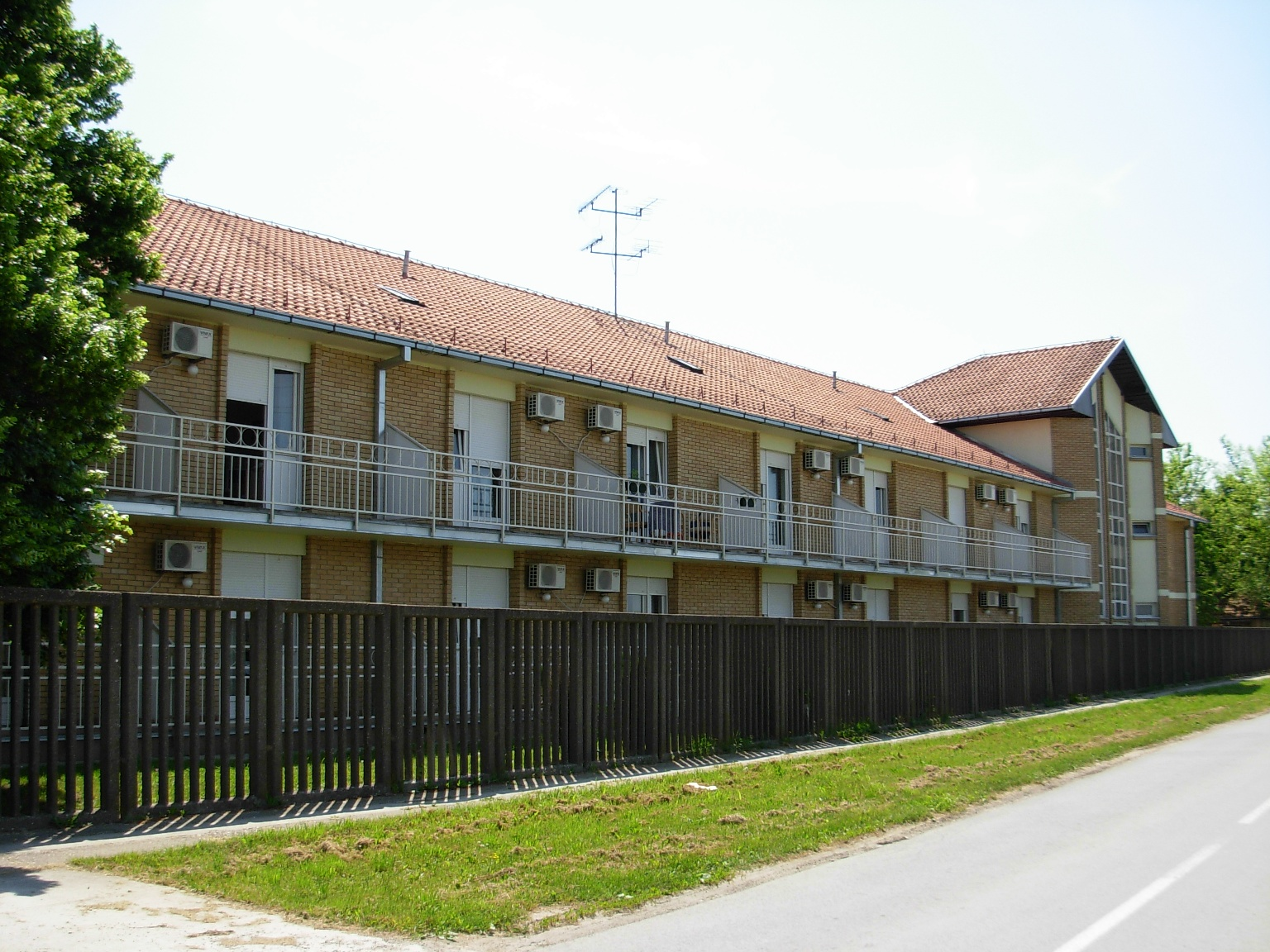
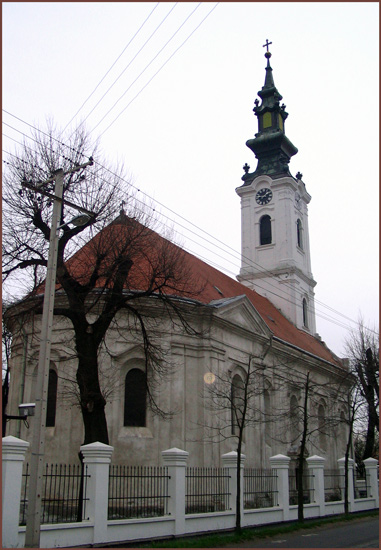
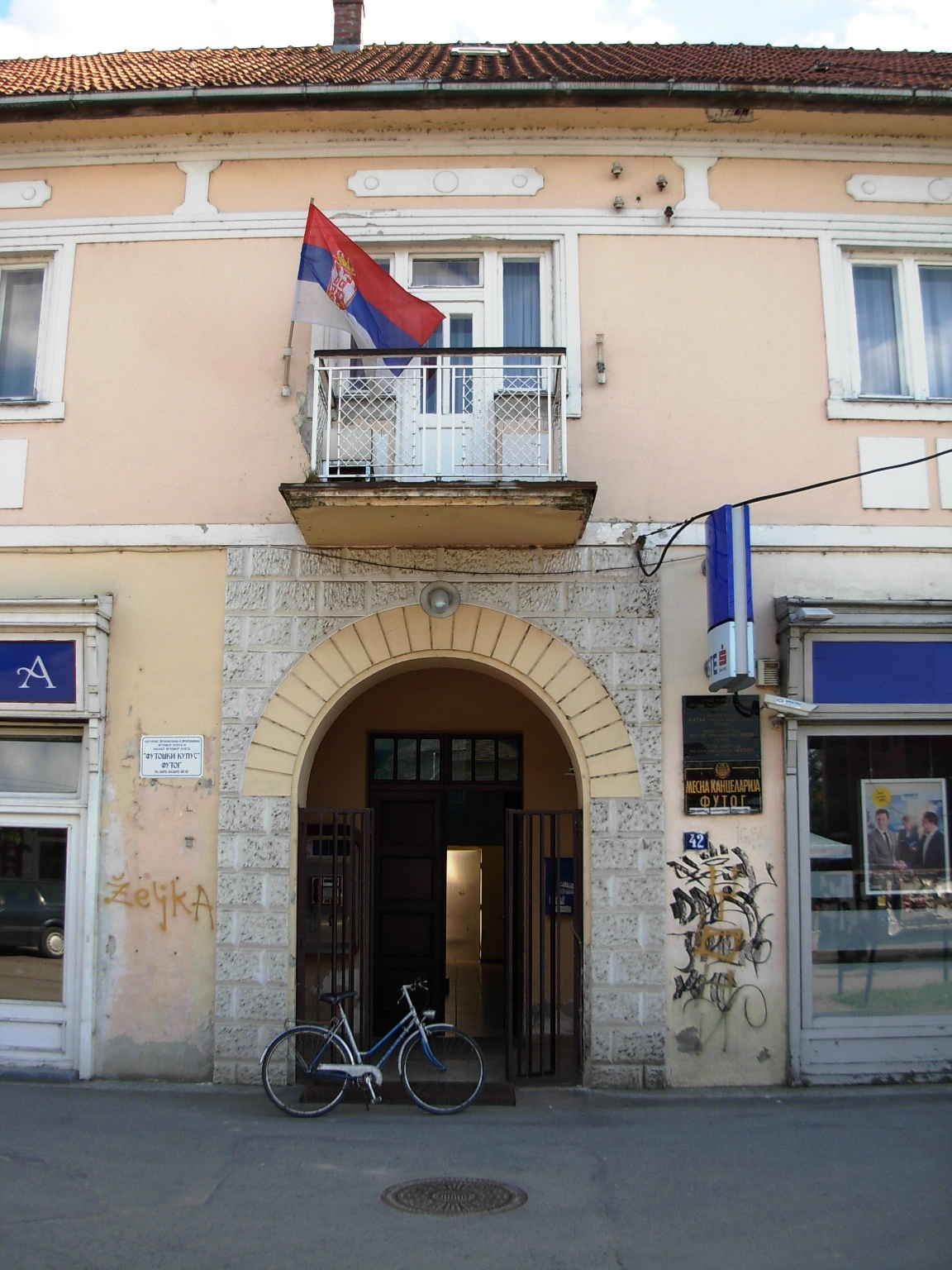
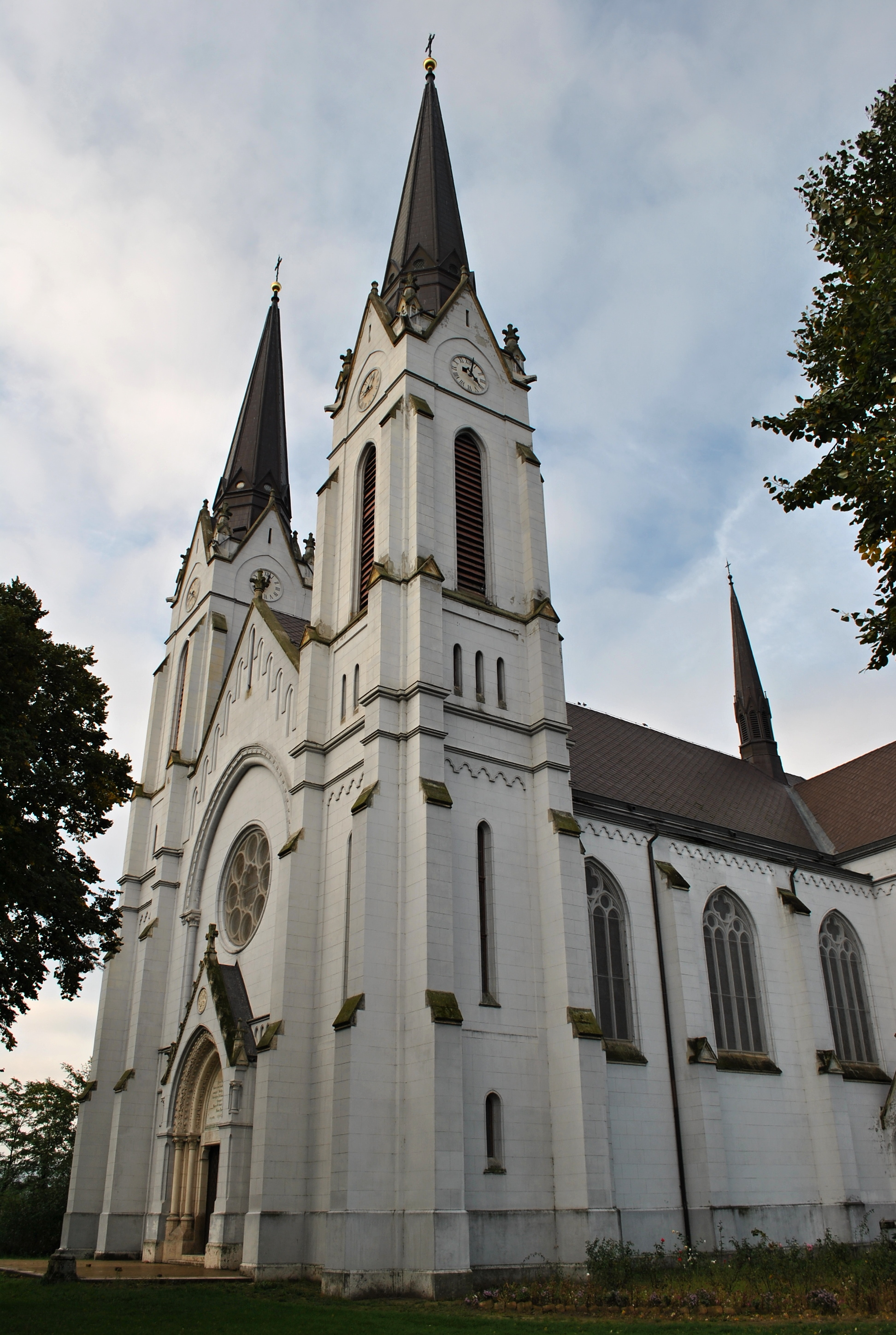
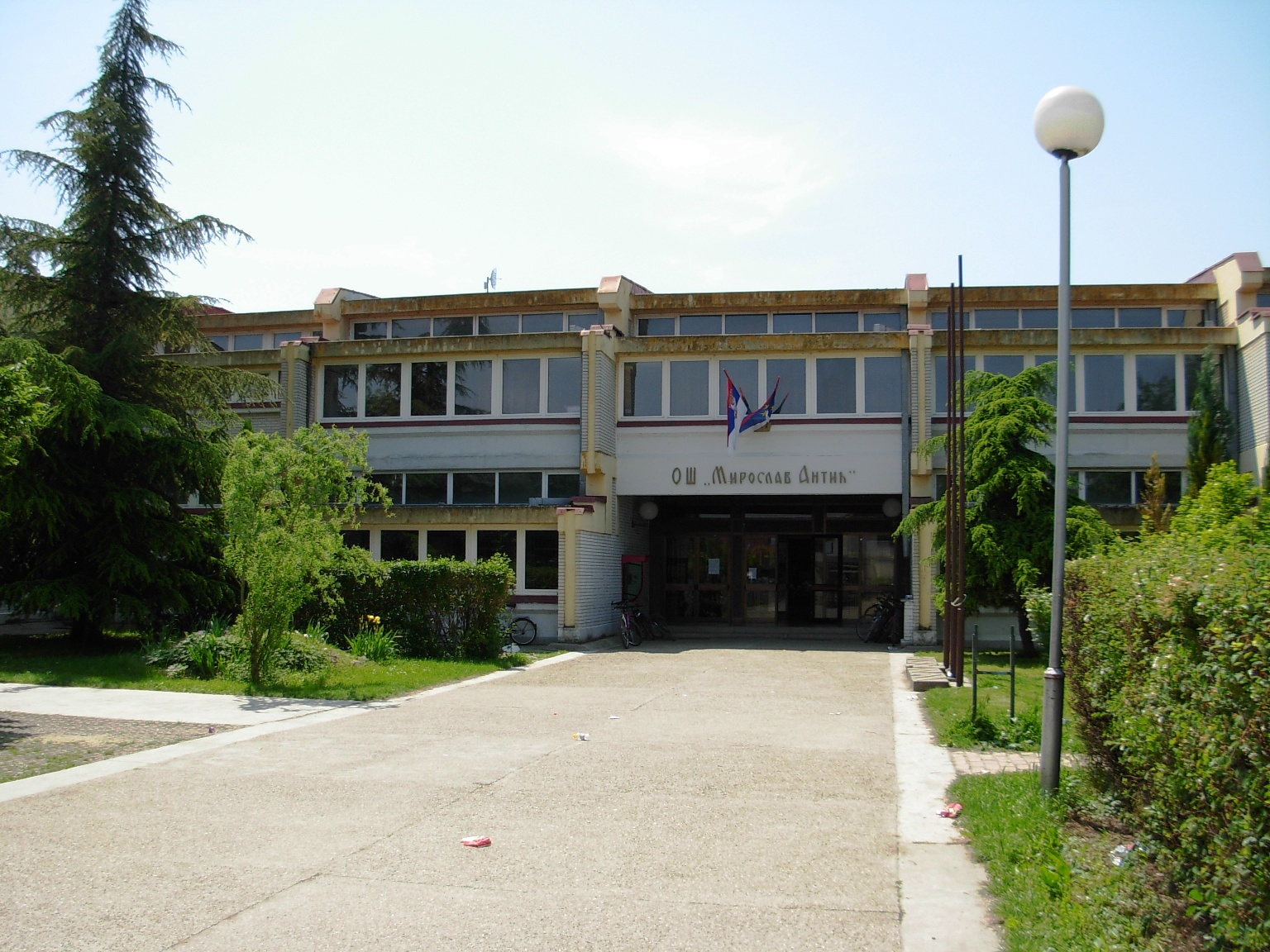
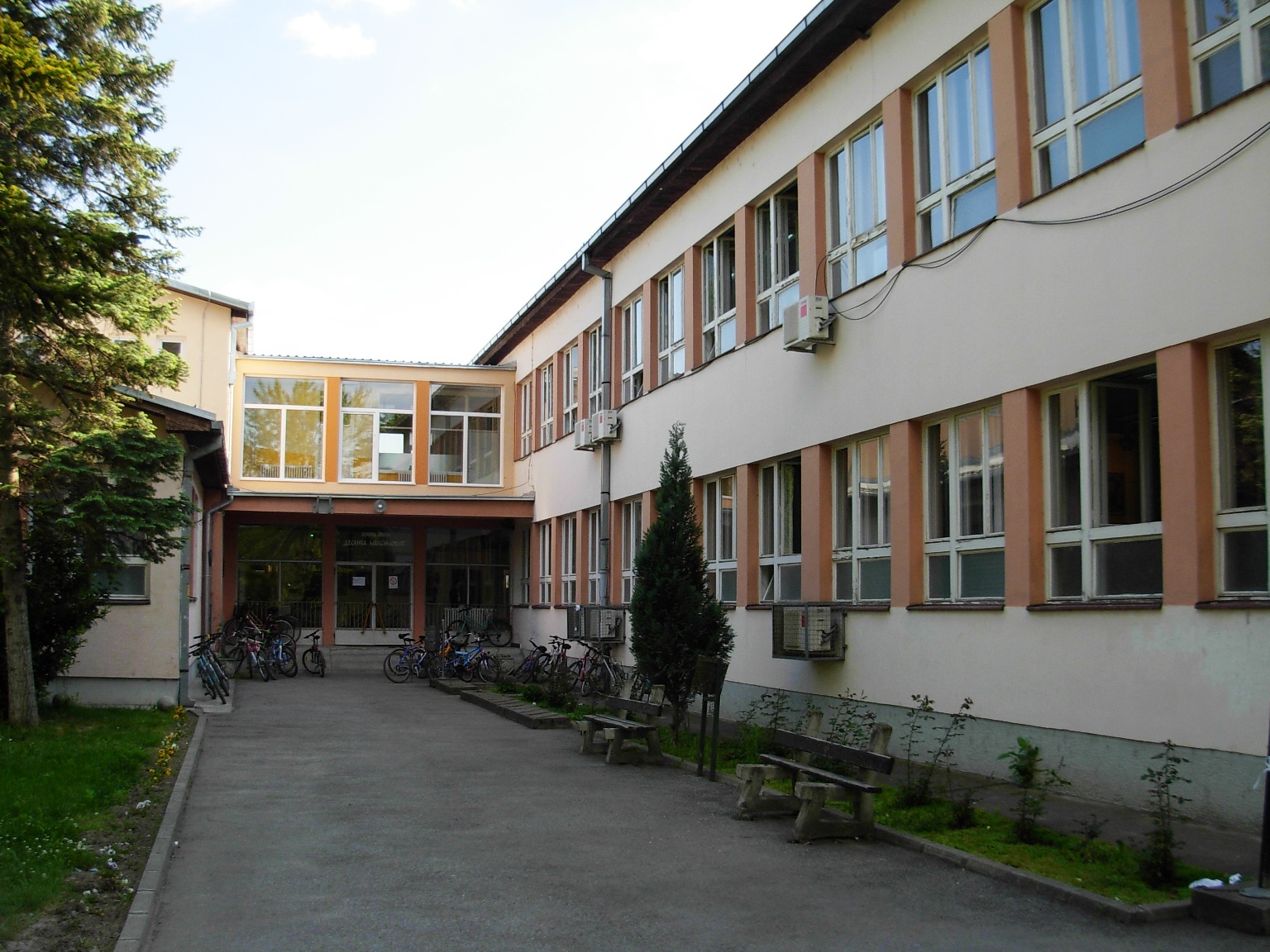
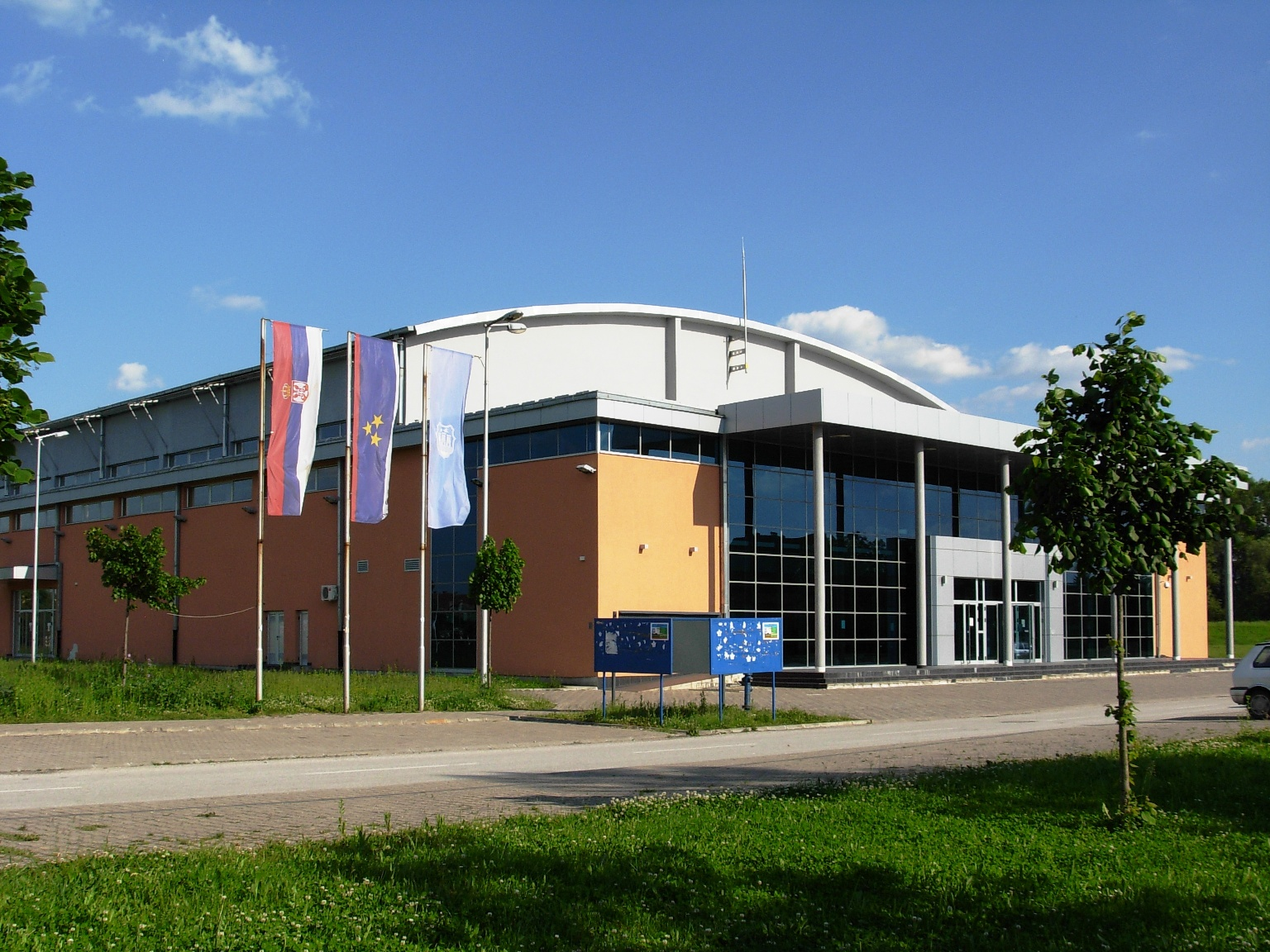
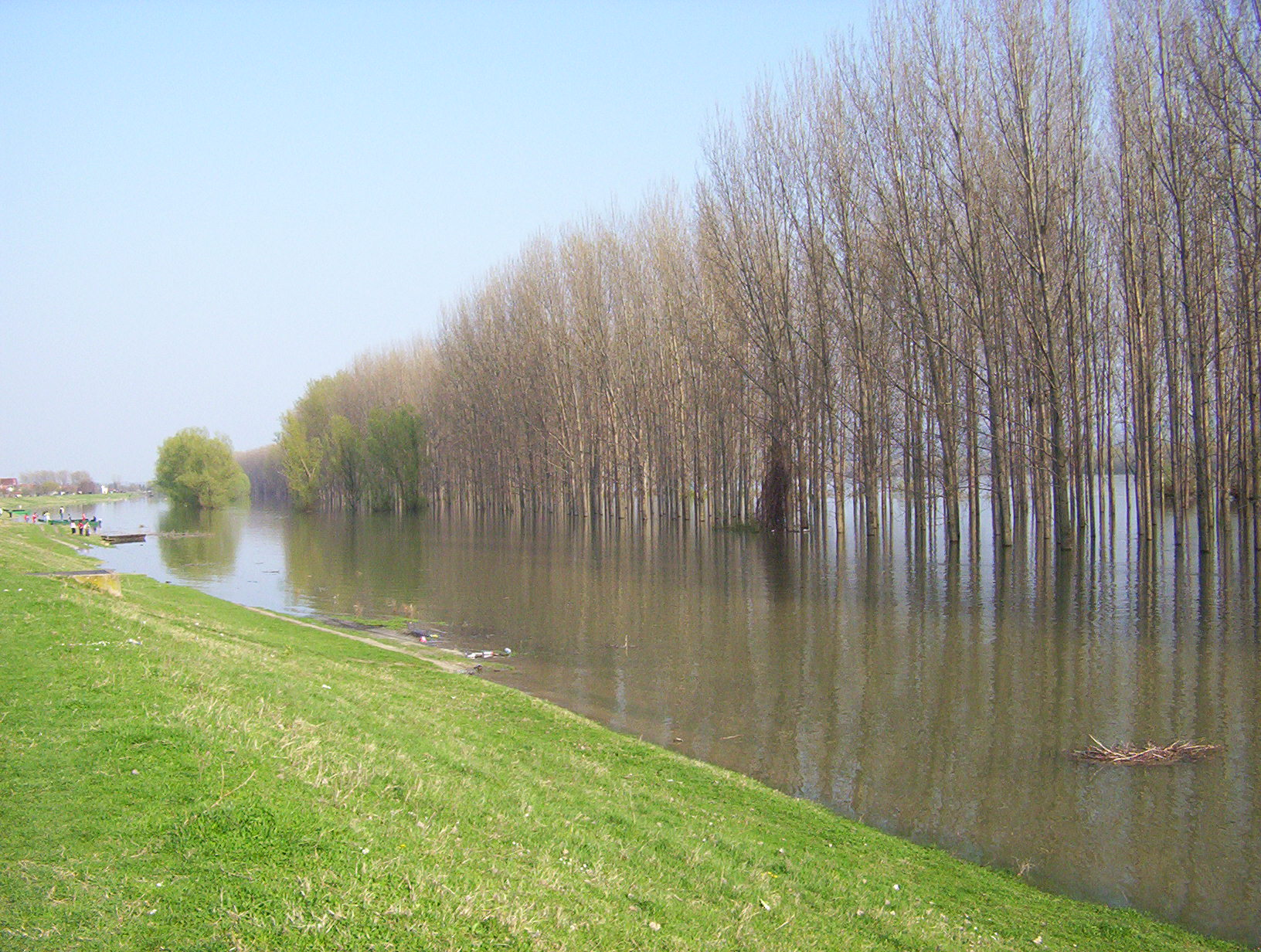
- Panorama of Futog Chotek Castle Gerontology Centre Church of the Holy Healers Cosmas and Damian Futog Community Office Church of the Sacred Heart of Jesus Miroslav Antić Elementary School Desanka Maksimović Elementary School Futog Sports Hall Danube in Futog Futog

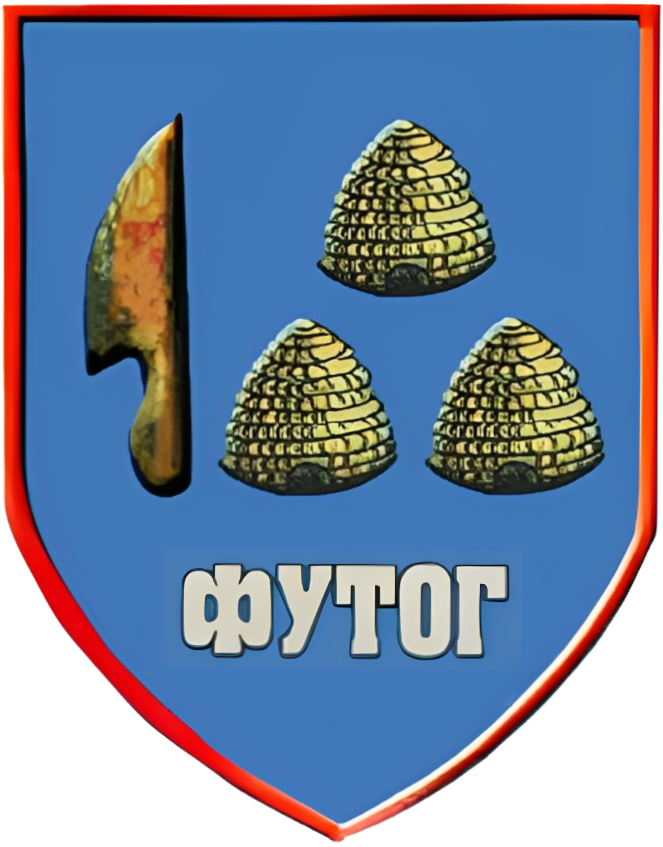
- Coat of arms

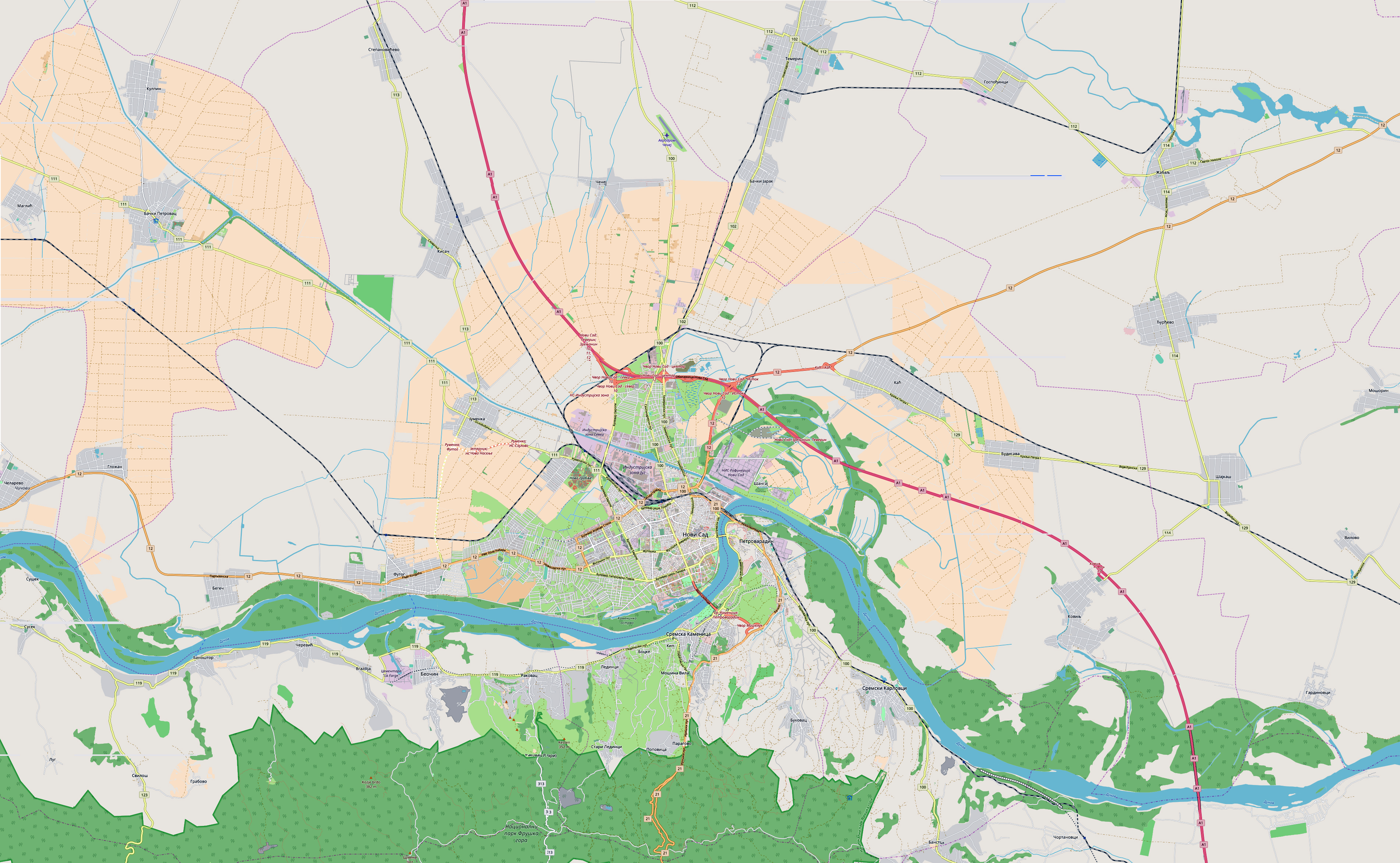
- Location within Novi Sad Futog (Vojvodina) Futog (Serbia)
- Coordinates: 45°14′N 19°43′E
- Country: Serbia
- Province: Vojvodina
- District: South Bačka
- Municipality: Novi Sad

Area
  - Total: 83.27 km^{2} (32.15 sq mi)

Population (2011)
  - Total: 18,641
  - Density: 223.9/km^{2} (579.8/sq mi)
- Time zone: UTC+1 (CET)
  - Summer (DST): UTC+2 (CEST)
- Postal code: 21410
- Area code: +381(0)21
- Car plates: NS

Futog (Serbian Cyrillic: Футог, German and Hungarian: Futak) is a village of the city of Novi Sad, Serbia, with a population of 18,642 according to the 2011 census in Serbia. It is situated in southern Bačka, 7 km away from Novi Sad.

== Name ==
Terra que Futog et a quibusdam Batkay nominatur is the first written mention of this village in 1250. It was formed from a personal name (+1086: Futoc) with a Hungarian nomenclature. The basis of the name is the hungarian derivative the verb fut, which means running, with a meaning of “courier”.

In Serbian, the town is known as Futog (Футог), in Croatian as Futog, in Hungarian as Futak, and in German as Alt-Futok.

== Demographics ==
Historical population
Year	Pop.	±%
1948	5,366	—
1953	6,049	+12.7%
1961	8,256	+36.5%
1971	10,614	+28.6%
1981	14,664	+38.2%
1991	16,048	+9.4%
2002	18,582	+15.8%
2011	18,641	+0.3%
Source: Census

The town had a population of 18,582 (2002 census). Ethnic groups included:

- Serbs = 16,828 (90.56%)
- Hungarians = 279 (1.50%)
- Yugoslavs = 226 (1.22%)
- others = 1249 (6.72%)

The population of the settlement was a quarter under 15 years old, two-thirds work-capable people, and 10% farmers.

== Geography ==
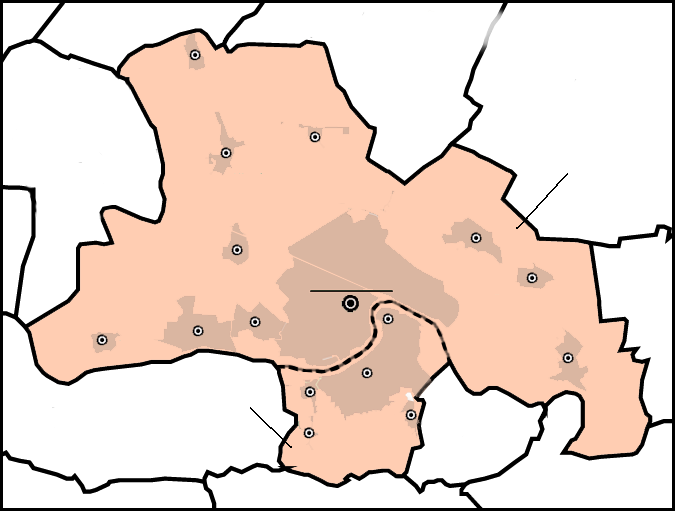

The village is situated in southern Bačka, 7 km away from Novi Sad, on the middle of the Danube stream. Neighbouring settlements are Veternik in the east, Begeč in the west and Rumenka in the north. The Danube river is located in the south of the town. The Futog area outspreads on a cofin terrace, alluvial plain and an inductional plane. Near Futog are two river isles, an effluent pulped in pond.The climate is medium-continental, influenced by Fruška Gora and the Danube. Winds are Košava, Western and Breeze. Precipitation is 700 mm a year. Hydrography includes the Danube river, pond and the Danube-Tisa-Danube Canal. The present plants are corn, wheat, industrial plants, vegetables, and its well-known cabbage. The present animals are ducks, storks, rabbits, foxes, pheasants. The village is 8 km long in the west–east direction around the main street. Its area is 8,561 hectares. Futog is divided into Stari Futog (Old Futog) and Novi Futog (New Futog).

== History ==
Archeological localities in the area include: Sesije, Gornje Šume, Vodice, Bokternica and Pašnjak. Although there are traces of Slavs in Bačka from before, Slavic presence in this area is confirmed by the data beginning in the 9th century, when the area was part of the Bulgarian Empire and the Bulgarian voivod Salan ruled in Bačka. The presence of Hungarians is dated to the 10th century, after Salan was defeated by the Hungarian forces.

Futog was mentioned for the first time in 1224 when Tatars devastated it. Before the Tatar invasion, the settlement was known as Batkay. In the 15th century it was an important market town. During the Hungarian administration, Futog was part of the Bacsensis County and was also a possession of the Futaky family in the 14th century, and a possession of the Jób Garai in the middle of the 15th century. In 1526-1527 it was part of the state of Emperor Jovan Nenad, and between 1528 and 1686 it was part of the Ottoman Empire. During the Ottoman administration, Futog was part of the Sanjak of Segedin and was mostly populated by Serbs and Muslims. According to the Ottoman traveler from the 17th century, Evliya Çelebi, the town of Vutok had a fortress, 4 Muslim religious buildings, including the mosque of Sulejman-han and 3 masjids, as well as about 180 houses.

After 1686, it was part of the Habsburg monarchy. Between 1696 and 1868, Futog had annual princes. The prince had a symbolical function. The Estate of Futog was a possession of the King's Chamber 1686-1703, of General Baron Josef von Neheim zu Berstrate 1703-1721, of Count John Josef O'Dwyer 1721-1731, of Count Friedrich Lorenz Cavriani 1731-1744, of Mihailo Čarnojević 1744-1769, of Count András Hadik 1769-1801, of Count Josef Brunszvik 1801-1852, and of Count Rudolf Chotek von Wognin 1852-1921, of Count Franz von Schönborn 1921-1942 and of Margrave Alessandro Pallavicino 1942-1944.

In 1715, the population of Futog was composed of 130 Serbian and 7 Hungarian households, while in 1720, it was composed of 126 Serbian and 14 Hungarian households. The area was later colonized by Germans. Near the Serb-populated Old Futog, Germans founded a new settlement known as the New Futog. Later, a sizable number of Germans settled in Old Futog as well. The Colonization of Germans ended in 1774.

In the 18th and the first half of the 19th century, Futog was part of the Batsch-Bodrog County within the Habsburg Kingdom of Hungary. In 1848-1849 Futog was part of the Serbian Vojvodian, a Serb self-proclaimed autonomous region within Austrian Empire, which got transformed between 1849 and 1860 into the Voivodeship of Serbia and Banat of Temeschwar, a separate crownland. After the abolishment of the voivodeship in 1860, Futog was again a part of the Batsch-Bodrog County. In 1910, the population of the Old Futog was ethnically mixed, with Germans and Serbs, while the population of the New Futog was mainly German. Other smaller ethnic groups in the town included Hungarians and Slovaks.

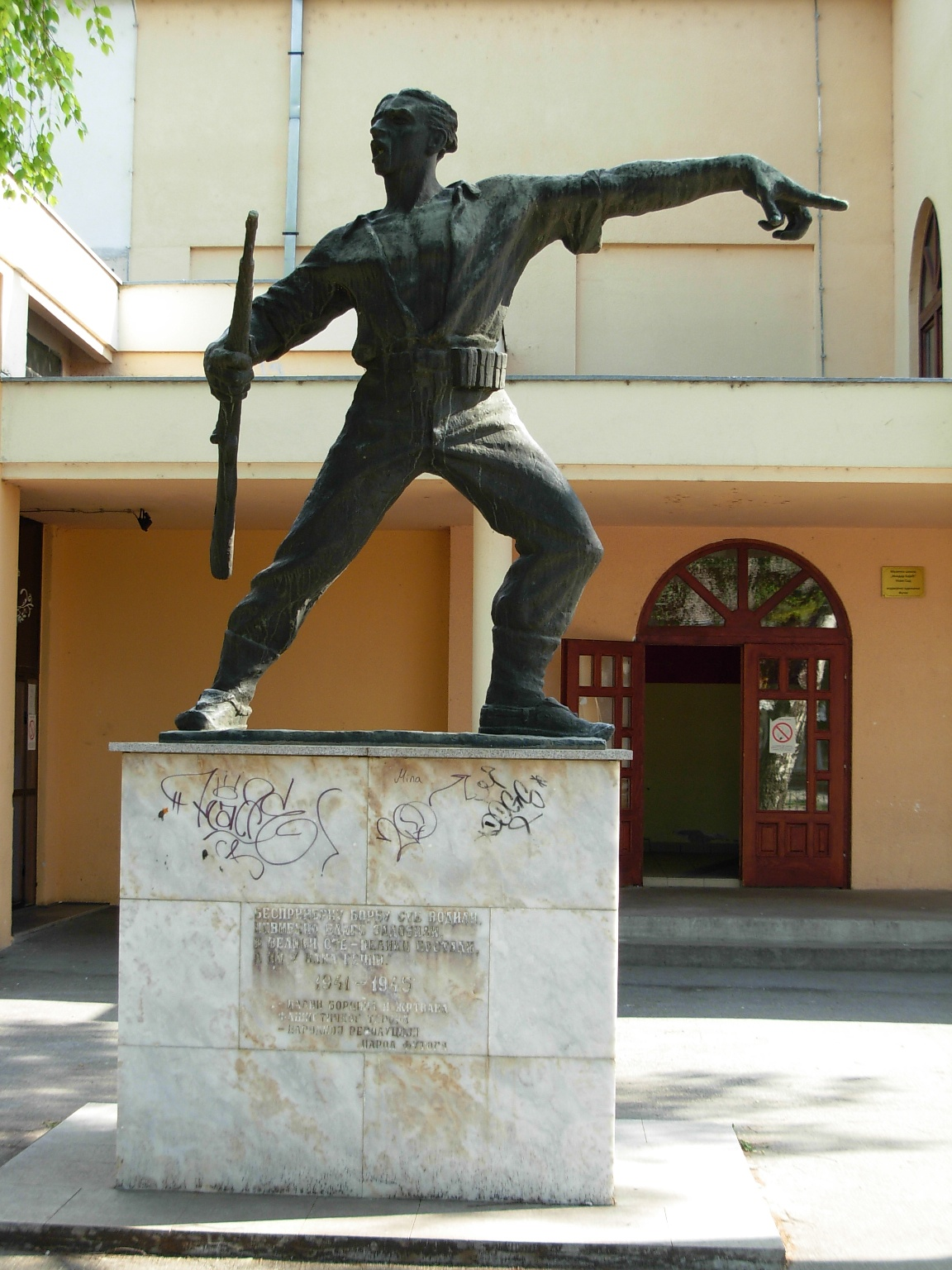
WWII memorial monument dedicated to the fallen partisan fighters and to the victims of fascist terror

In 1918, Futog, as part of the Banat, Bačka and Baranja region, became part of the Kingdom of Serbia, as was decided by the decree of the Great people's assembly in Novi Sad in 1918, November 2). Since December 1, 1918, it was part of the Kingdom of Serbs, Croats and Slovenes (later known as Yugoslavia). From 1918 to 1922, Futog was part of the Novi Sad County, from 1922 to 1929 a part of the Bačka Oblast, and from 1929 to 1941 a part of the Danube Banovina.

During World War II (in 1941), after the Axis powers invaded and partitioned Yugoslavia, the town came under Axis occupation and was attached to Bács-Bodrog County of Horthy's Hungary. After the defeat of Axis powers there in 1944, one part of the local German population left from the area, together with the defeated German army. The Anti-Fascist Council for the National Liberation of Yugoslavia (AVNOJ) declared the remaining German population as public enemies and sent them to communist prison camps. After the abolishment of the camps in 1948, the remaining German population left from Yugoslavia, mainly because of economical reasons. Since 1944, the town was part of Yugoslav Vojvodina, which from 1945 was a part of socialist Serbia within the new socialist Yugoslavia. After the Second World War, in 1945 and 1946 Futog was settled by Serb families which mostly originated from Bosnia, Lika, and Srem. Population censuses conducted after the war recorded a Serb ethnic majority in the town.

== Sights ==
- A baroque Serbian Orthodox Church of the Holy Healers Cosmas and Damian from 1776.
- Futog Court, today Agricultural school (baroque-classicism), built by grof Andras Hadik in 1777, where few days before Sarajevo Attempt resided Archduke Franz Ferdinand and his wife Sofia Chotek, and also a place where German general August von Mackensen was imprisoned in 1919.
- Old Rectory from 1777 belongs to citizen architecture of the 18th century.
- Serbian Orthodox Church 1781-1947; village baroque.
- “Rudolphinum” or “Bastilja” of 1893; eclecticism; today Internat.
- “Marianum” of 1894; historicism; today Gerontological centre.
- Roman Catholic Church “Sacred Heart of Jesus” of 1908; neogothic cathedral.
- Fire Brigade Home of 1909 with a tower of 1932.
- Roman Catholic Church “Holy Trinity” of 1940, no spiritual practice.

== Culture and media ==
The village is home to the Cultural-Informative Centre “Mladost”, Tambura Orchestra, Folklore Assembly, Town library “Jovan Jovanović Zmaj”, galleries, etc.There is a Radio "Futog" at 97,5 and 99,5 MHz FM and Radio "Srna" at 91,90 MHz FM. The village is also famous for Bojana Kozomora (ex)Kovačević and Zorica Tepić Andrić.

== Education ==
There are two primary schools: “Desanka Maksimović” and “Miroslav Antić”. There is also a secondary Agricultural Boarding School. The first school in the town was established in 1707.

== Sport ==
There is a Sport Hall Futog in the village. Football clubs in the town are OFK “Futog” and FK “Metalac-Asco Vidak”, there is also fight club “Faraon”, volleyball clubs OKK “Futog” and "RFU", handball club RK “Metalac”, and basketball club KK "Futog".

== Economy and traffic ==
Industry includes: “Milan Vidak” wire factory; “Aroma” spice factory; “Garant” motor factory; “Futožanka” provender factory; “Vagar” scale factory; and “Planta” agricultural goods.

Car-road Novi Sad-Bačka Palanka; rail-road Novi Sad-Sombor; and the Danube river are important traffic directions situated at this location.

Novi Sad's regular bus lines 53 (FUTOG STARI), 54 (FUTOG GRMEČKA), 55 (FUTOG BRAĆE BOŠNJAK) and 56 (BEGEČ) connecting the town with Novi Sad.

A ferry from Futog to Beočin is operating on a regular basis for those who would like to cross the Danube while avoiding detours through bridges in the area.

== Notable people ==
- Aleksandar Zečević (born 1996), basketball player in the Israeli Basketball Premier League

== Gallery ==
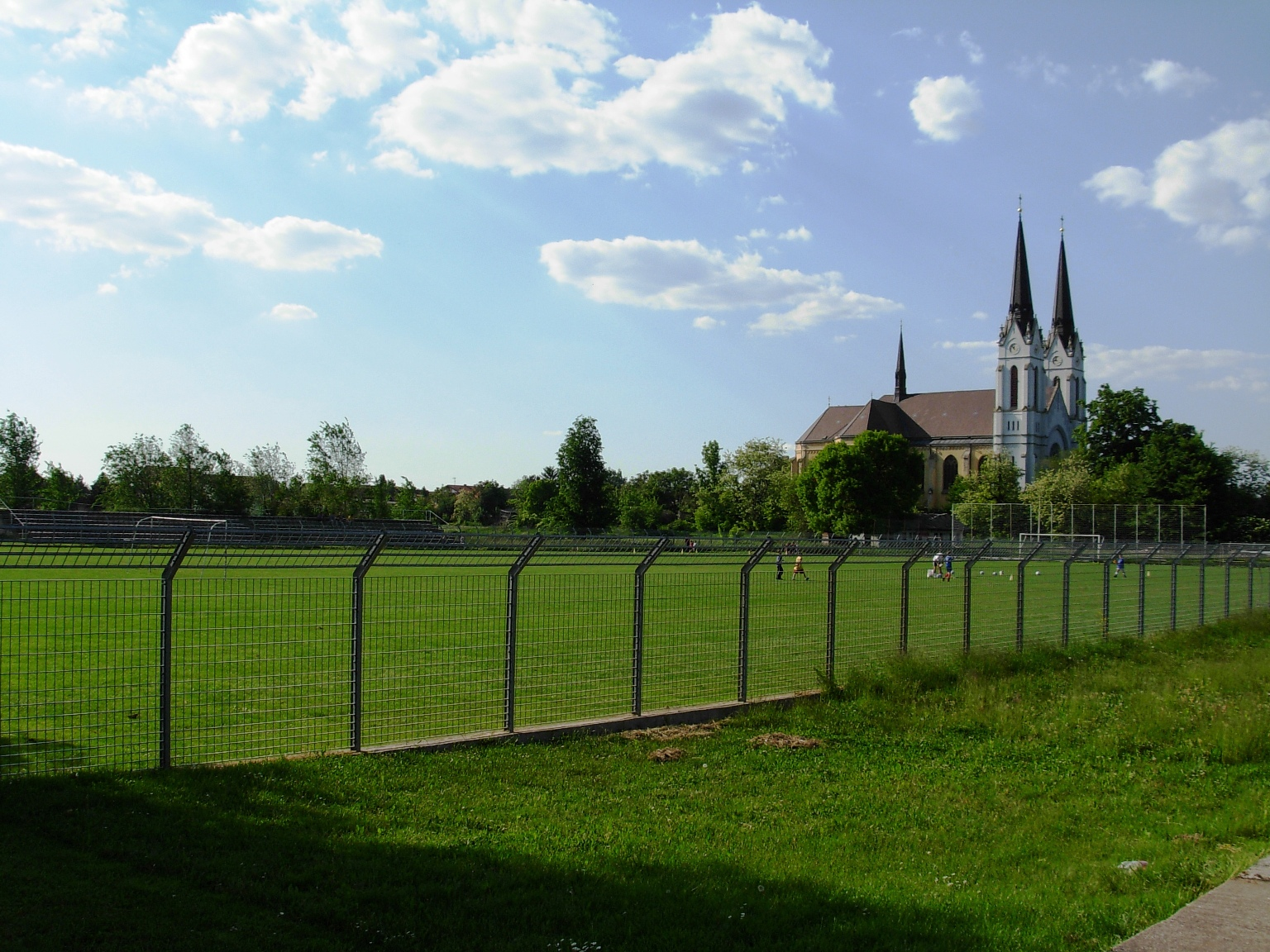
FK Metalac Stadium

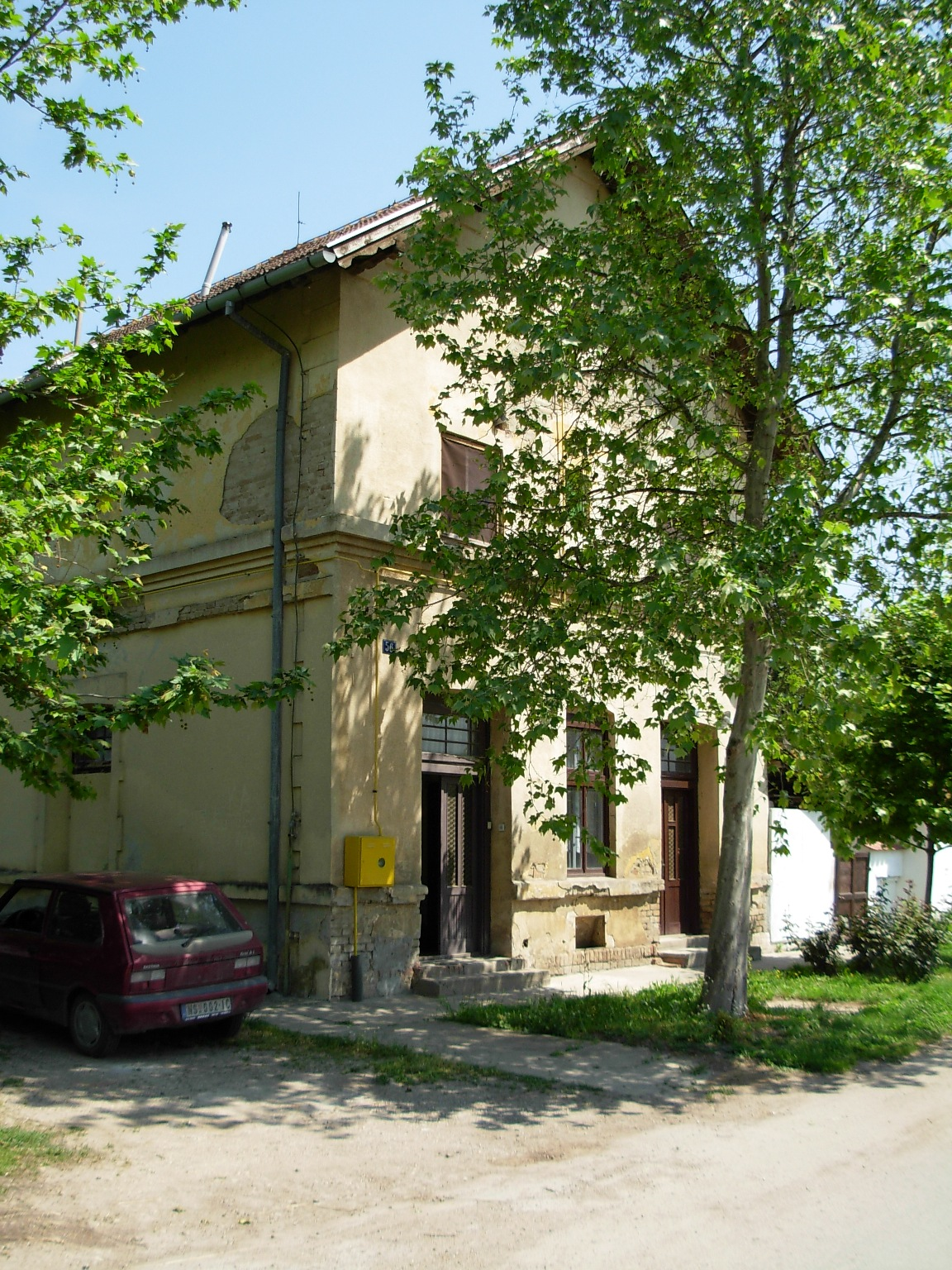
Train Station

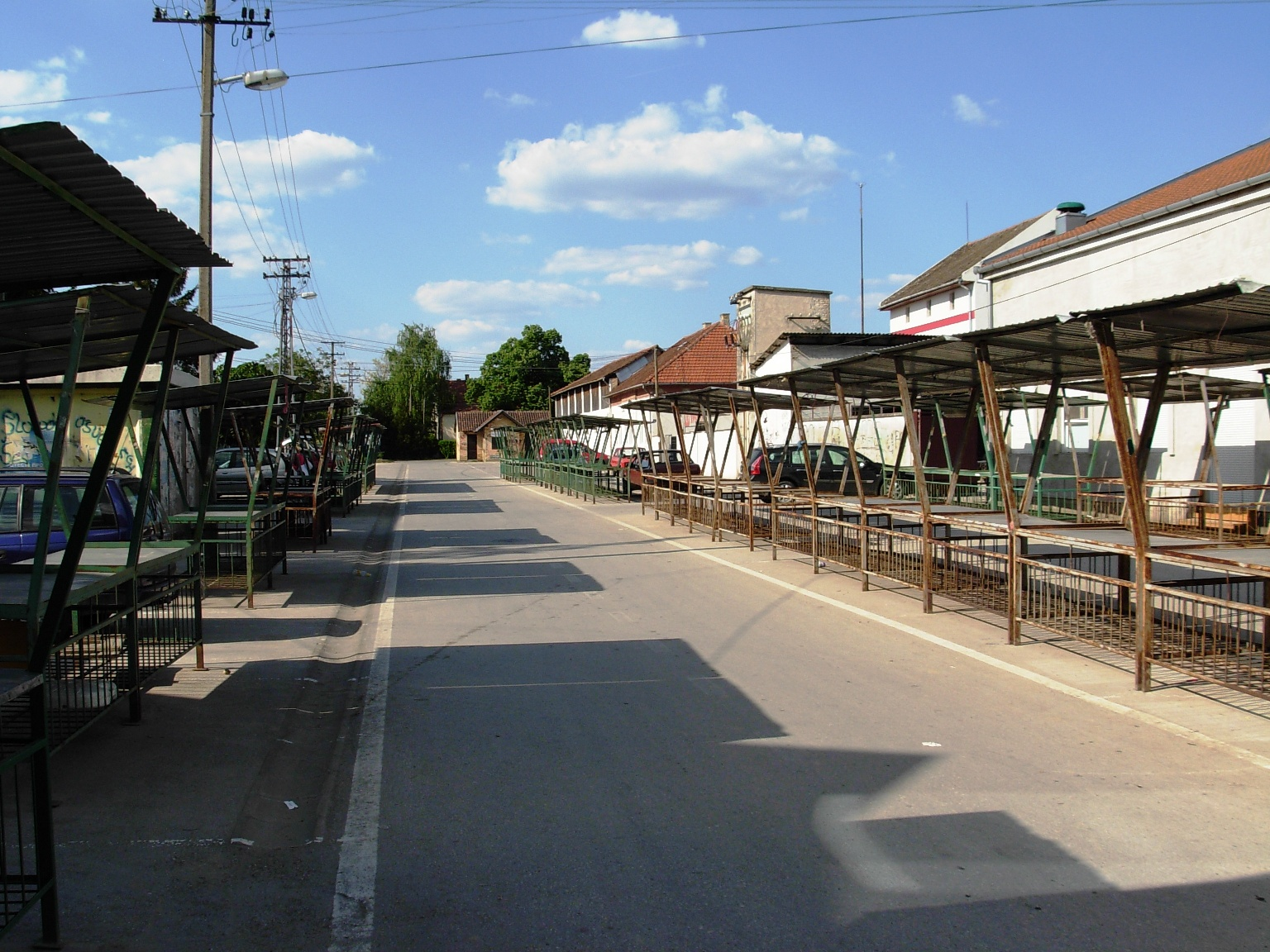
Market

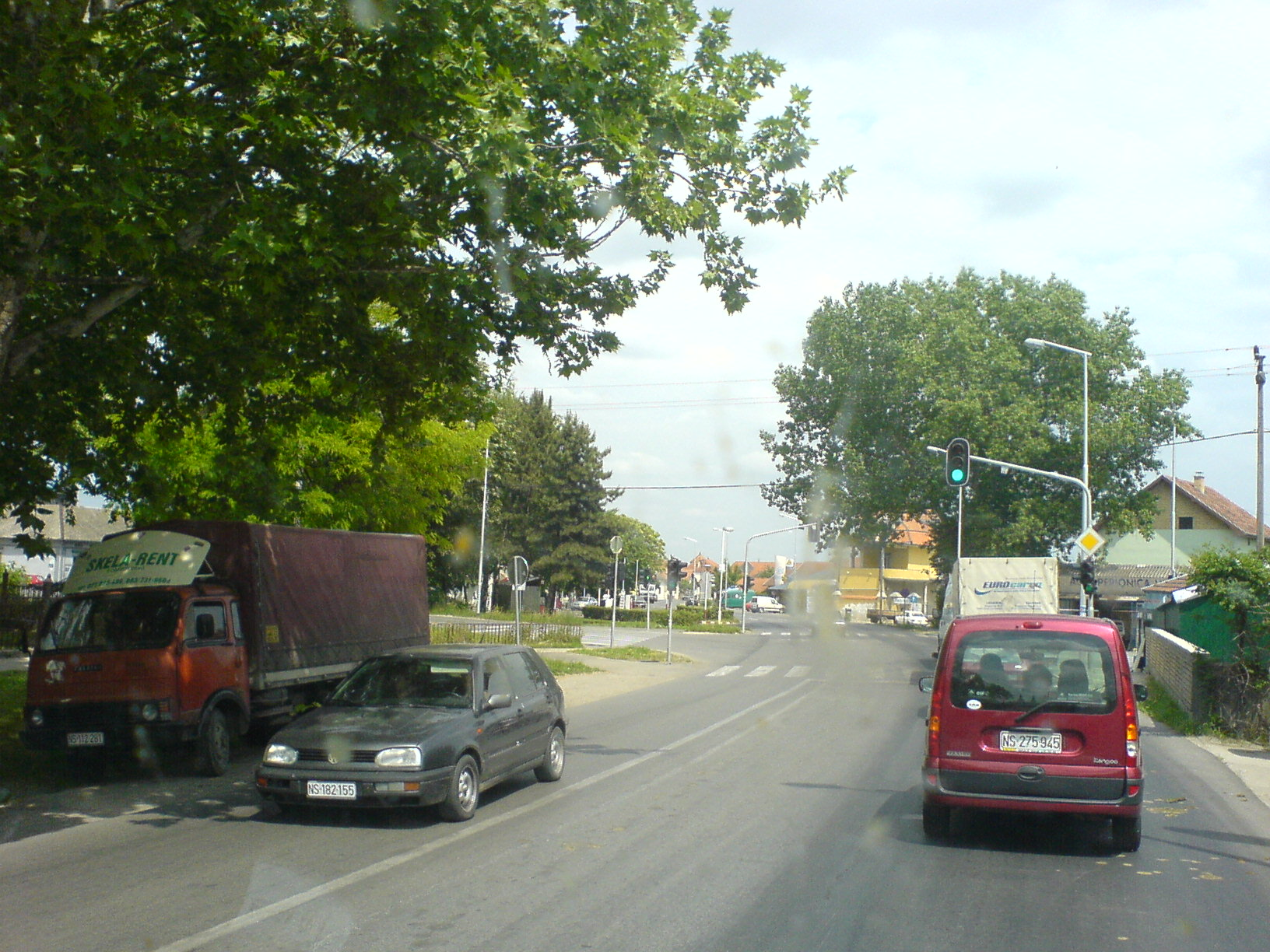
Center of the town

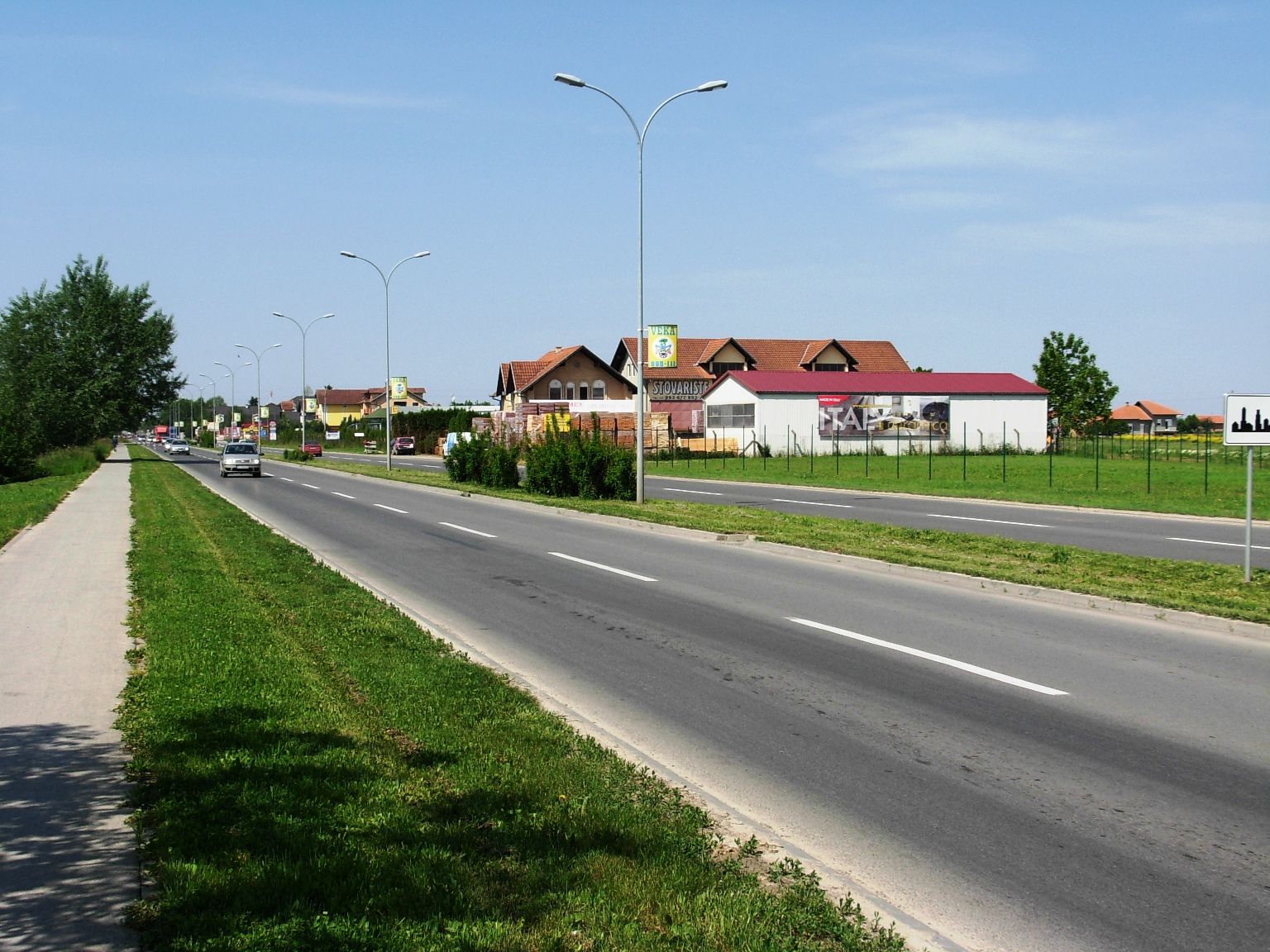
Town entry

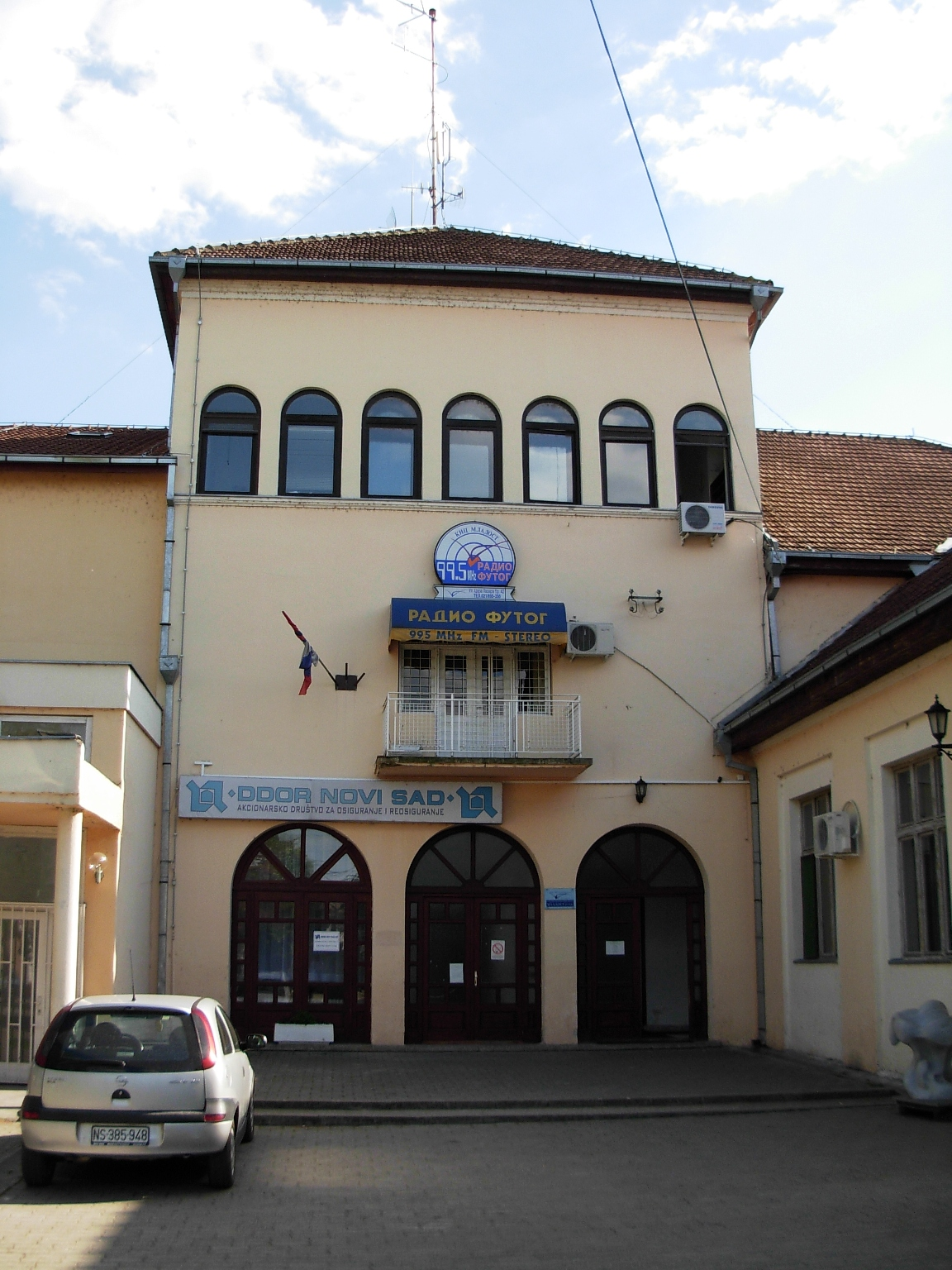
Radio Futog

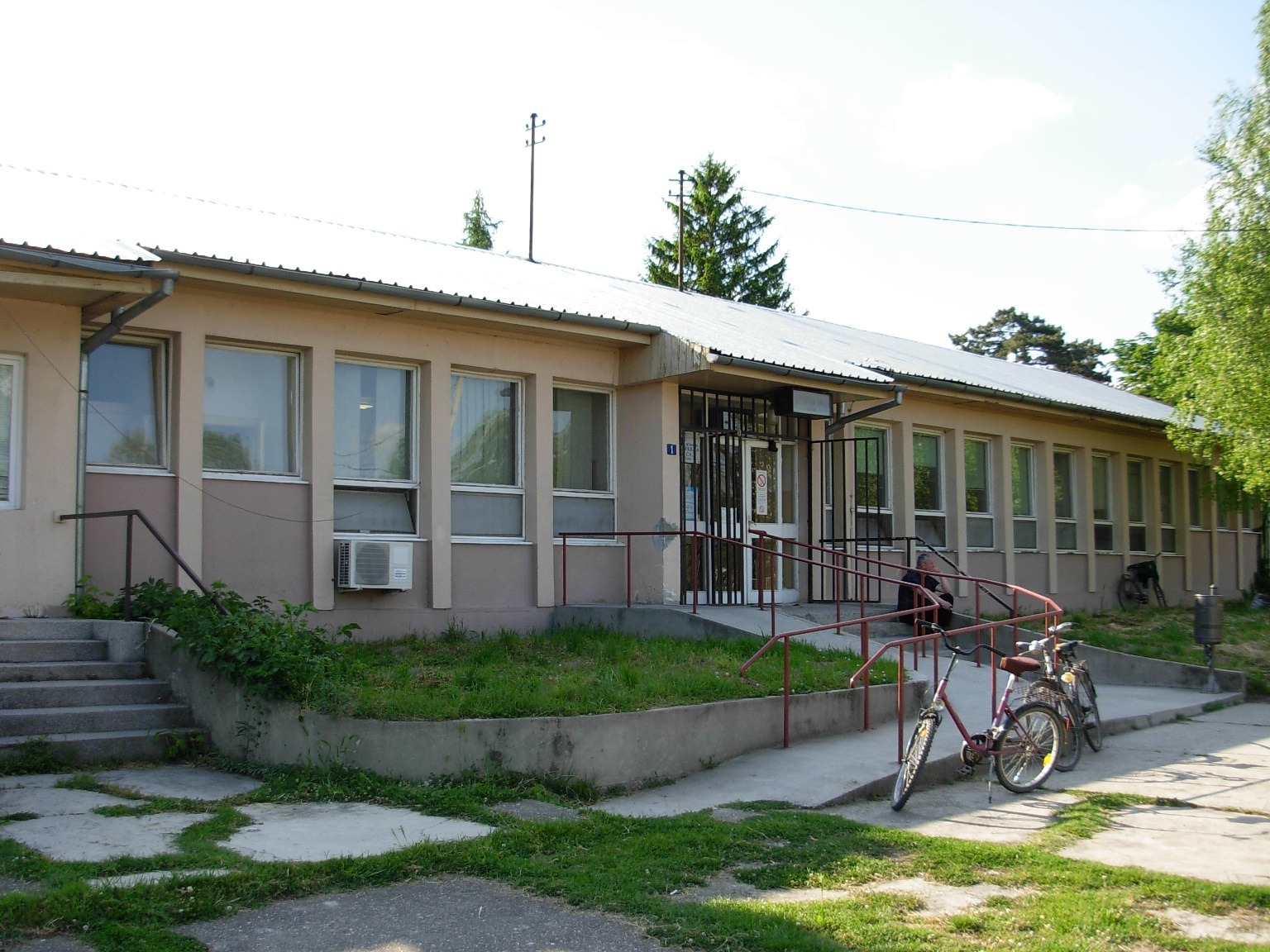
Health centre

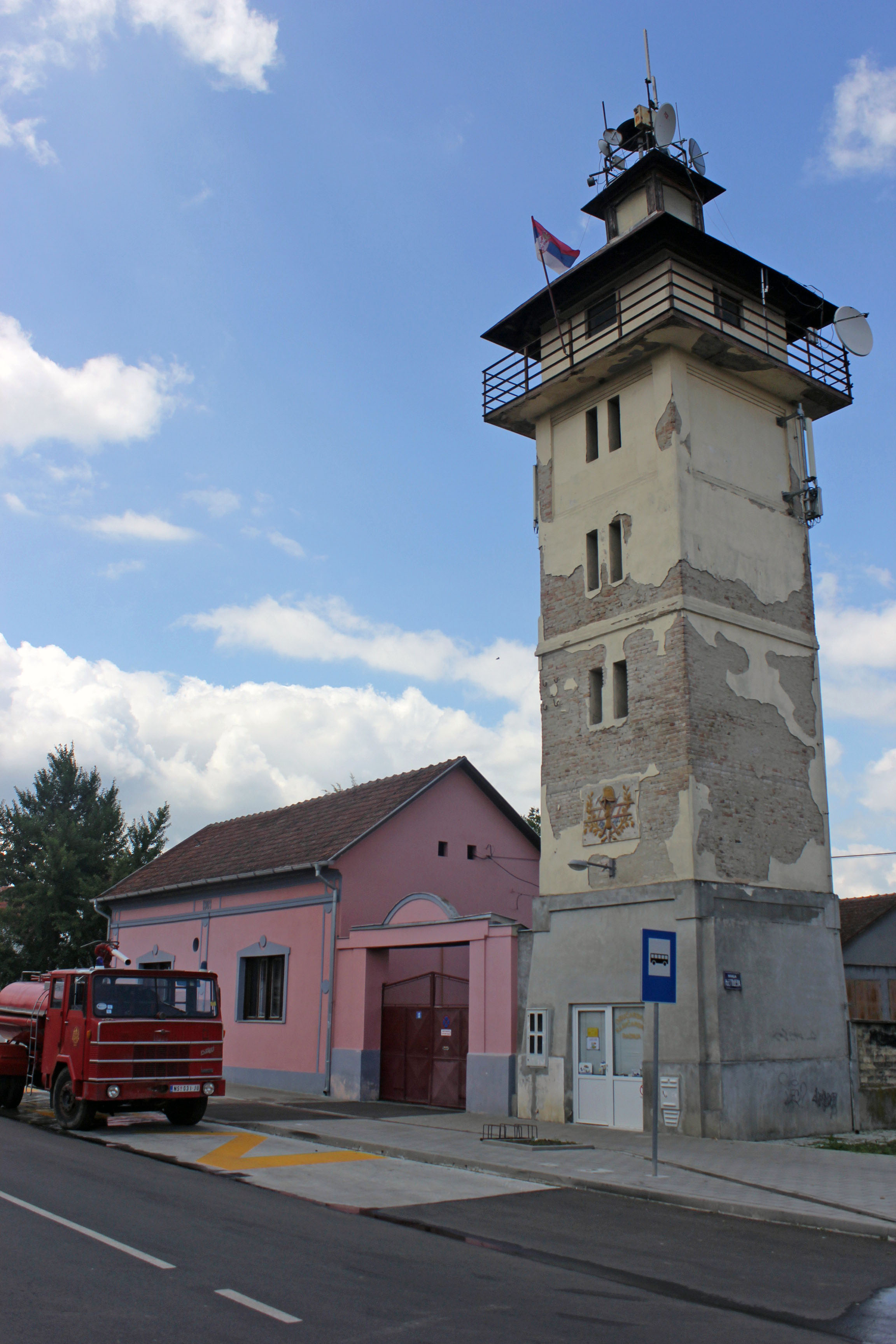
Fire station

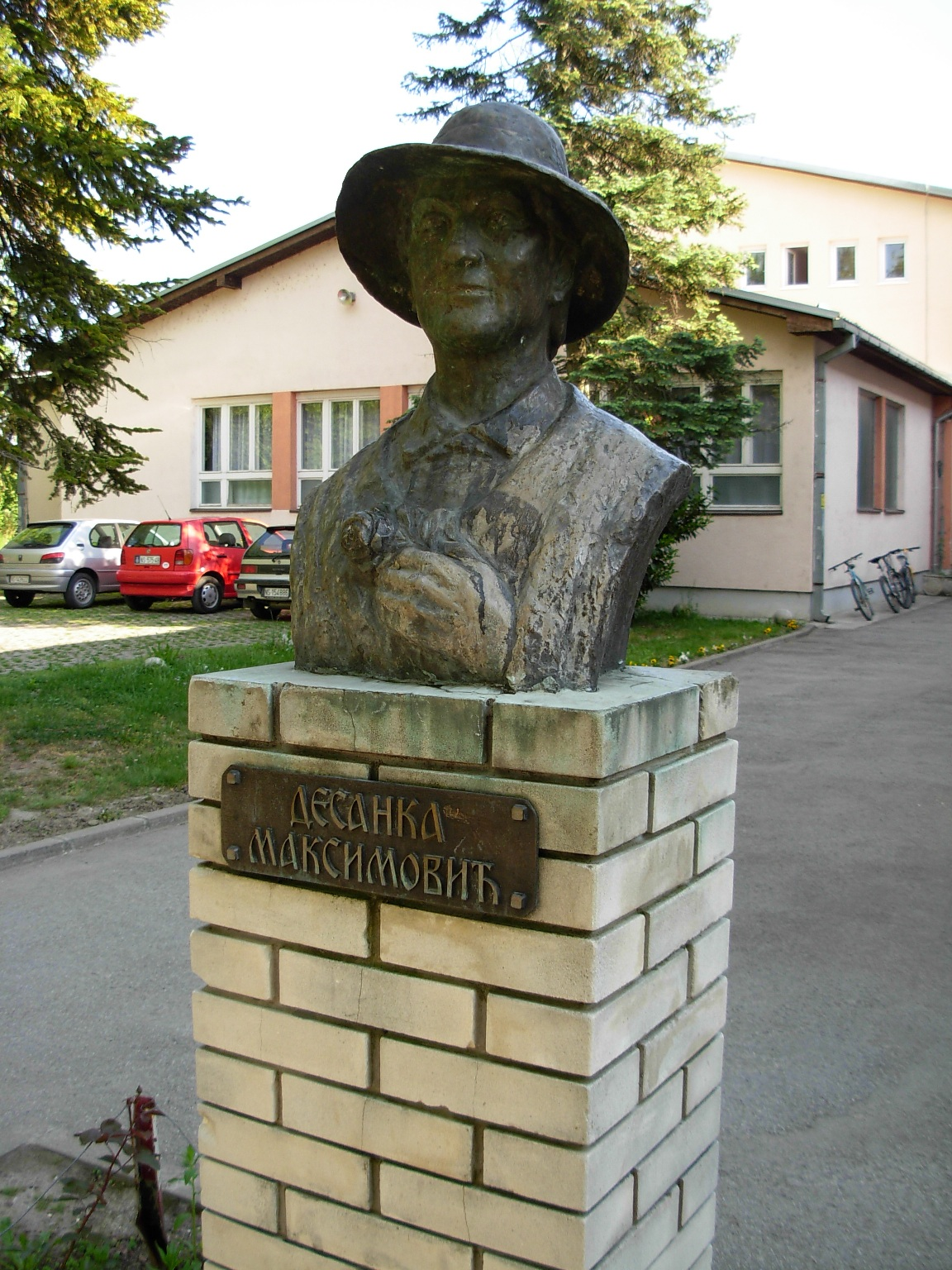
Bust of Desanka Maksimović

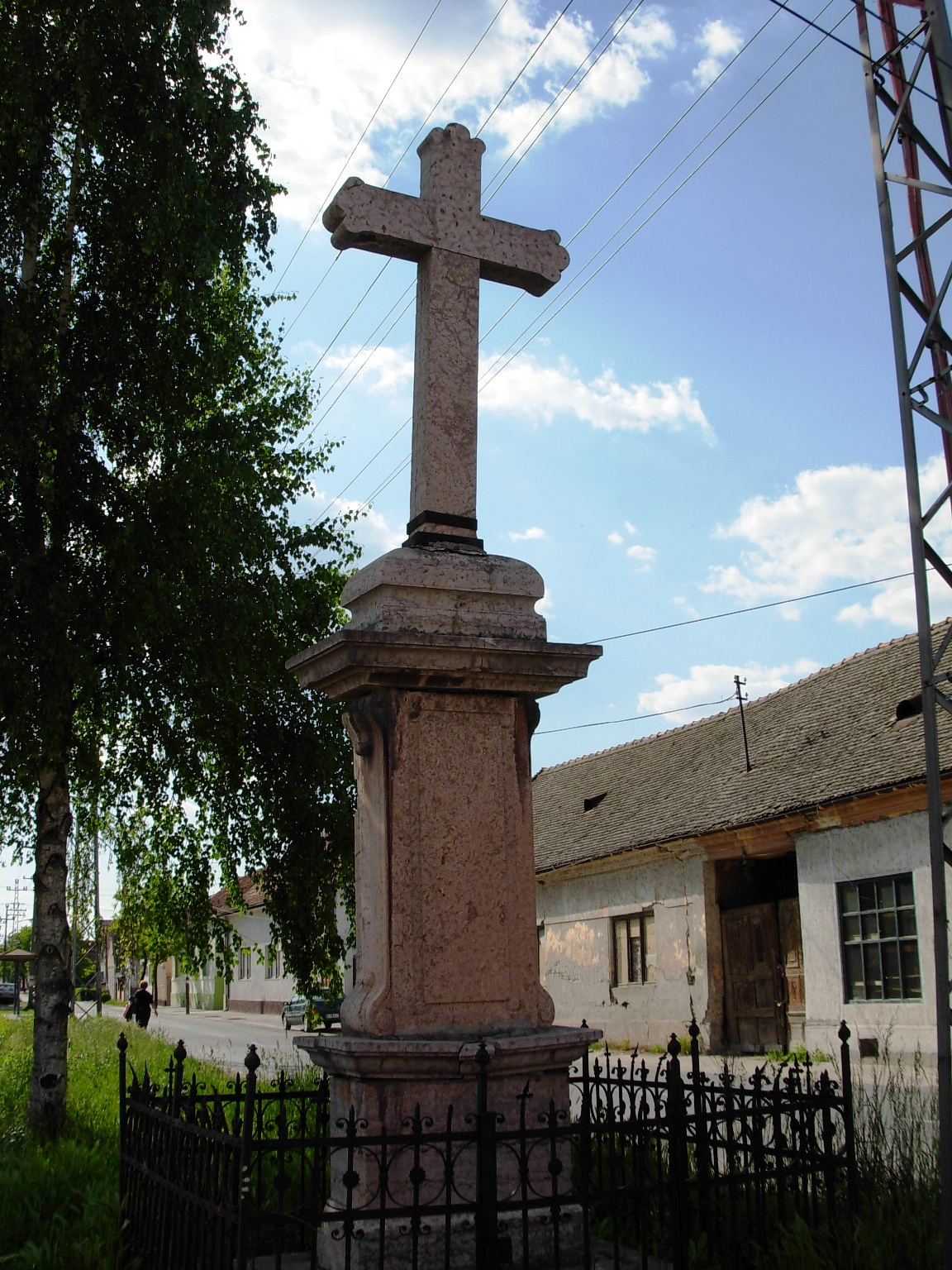
Holy vow cross in Futog

== See also ==
- Novi Sad
- South Bačka District
- Bačka
- Vojvodina
- List of places in Serbia
- List of cities, towns and villages in Vojvodina
