= Stubla =

Stubla can refer to:

- Stubla (Bojnik), a village in Bojnik, Serbia
- Stublla (Gjakova) or Stubëll, a village in Gjakova, Kosovo
- Stubla (Medveđa), a village in Medveđa, Serbia
- Stublla e Poshtme, a village in Viti, Kosovo
- Stublla e Epërme, a village in Viti, Kosovo
