= Čokotin =

Čokotin Чокотин (Serbian)
- Village
- Location within Serbia
- Coordinates: 42°48′42″N 21°28′39″E
- Country: Serbia
- District: Jablanica District
- Municipality: Medveđa

Population (2002)
  - Total: 56
- Time zone: UTC+1 (CET)
  - Summer (DST): UTC+2 (CEST)

Čokotin is a village in the municipality of Medveđa, Serbia. According to the 2002 census, the village has a population of 56 people.
