= Poroštica (Medveđa) =

Poroštica Пороштица (Serbian)
- Village
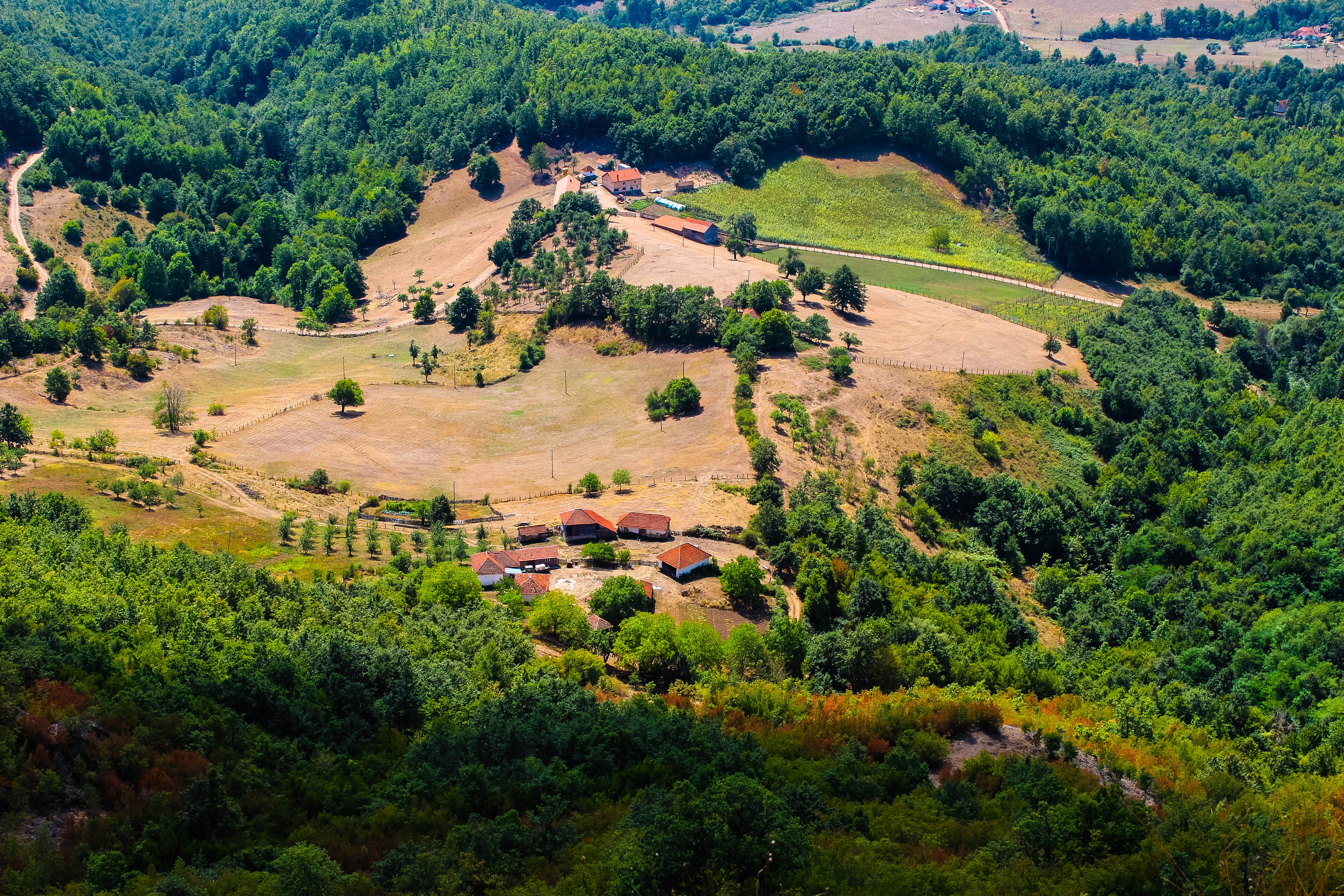

- Location within Serbia
- Coordinates: 42°45′48″N 21°28′13″E
- Country: Serbia
- District: Jablanica District
- Municipality: Medveđa

Population (2002)
  - Total: 41
- Time zone: UTC+1 (CET)
  - Summer (DST): UTC+2 (CEST)

Poroštica is a village in the municipality of Medveđa, Serbia. According to the 2002 census, the village has a population of 41 people.
