= Vrapce, Medveđa =

Vrapce Врапце (Serbian)
- Village
- Location within Serbia
- Country: Serbia
- District: Jablanica District
- Municipality: Medveđa

Population (2002)
  - Total: 45
- Time zone: UTC+1 (CET)
  - Summer (DST): UTC+2 (CEST)

Vrapce is a village in the municipality of Medveđa, Serbia.

== 2002 population ==
According to the 2002 census, the village had a population of 45.
