= Petrilje =

Petrilje Петриље (Serbian)
- Village
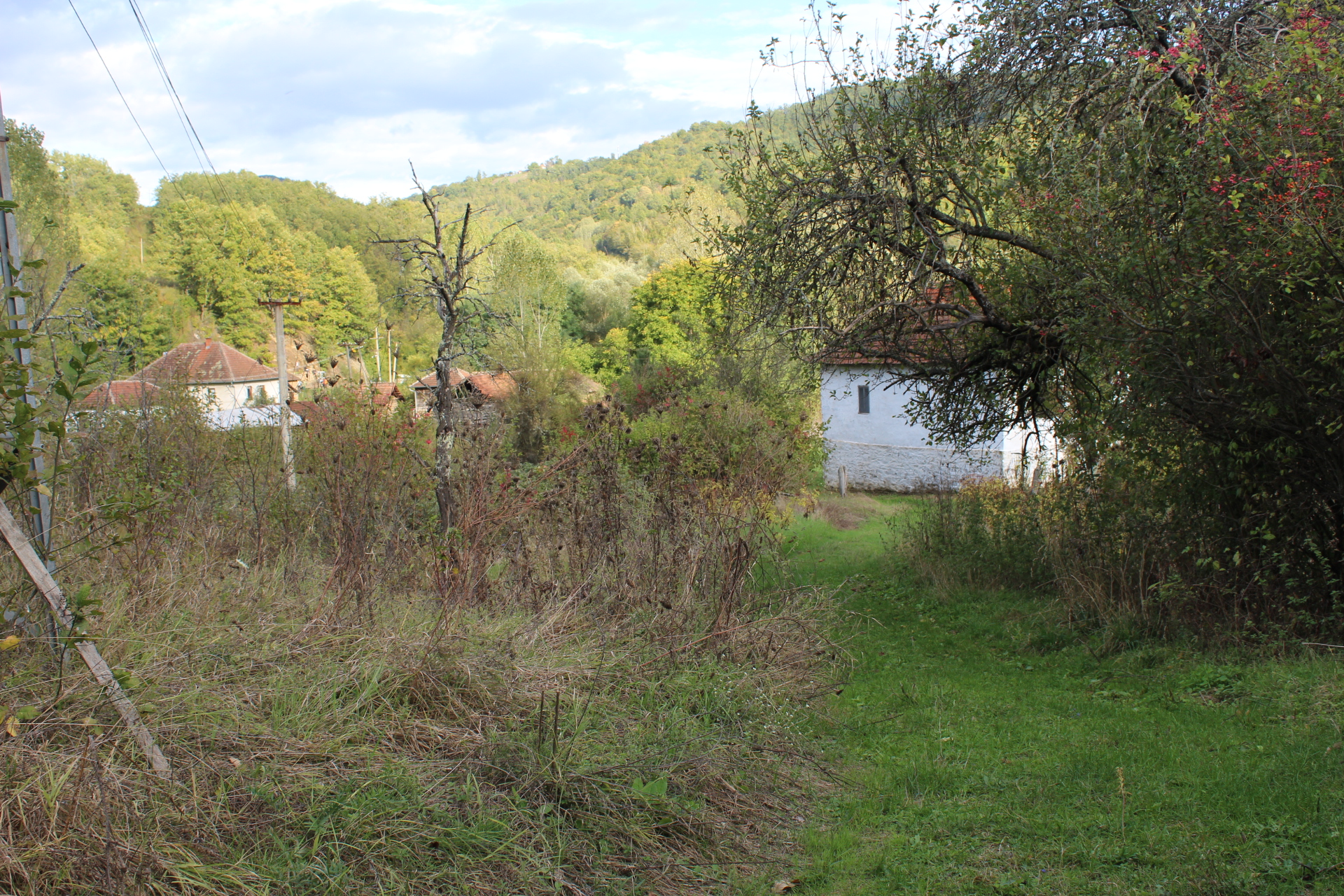

- Location within Serbia
- Coordinates: 42°47′27″N 21°33′11″E
- Country: Serbia
- District: Jablanica District
- Municipality: Medveđa

Population (2002)
  - Total: 63
- Time zone: UTC+1 (CET)
  - Summer (DST): UTC+2 (CEST)

Petrilje is a village in the municipality of Medveđa, Serbia. According to the 2002 census, the village has a population of 63 people.

== History ==
The village was mentioned in the late middle ages as "Arbanashka Petrila" which translates into "The Albanian Petrila" and indicates an Albanian presence The village was mentioned in 1566-1574 as Arbanashka Petrila.

== Gallery ==
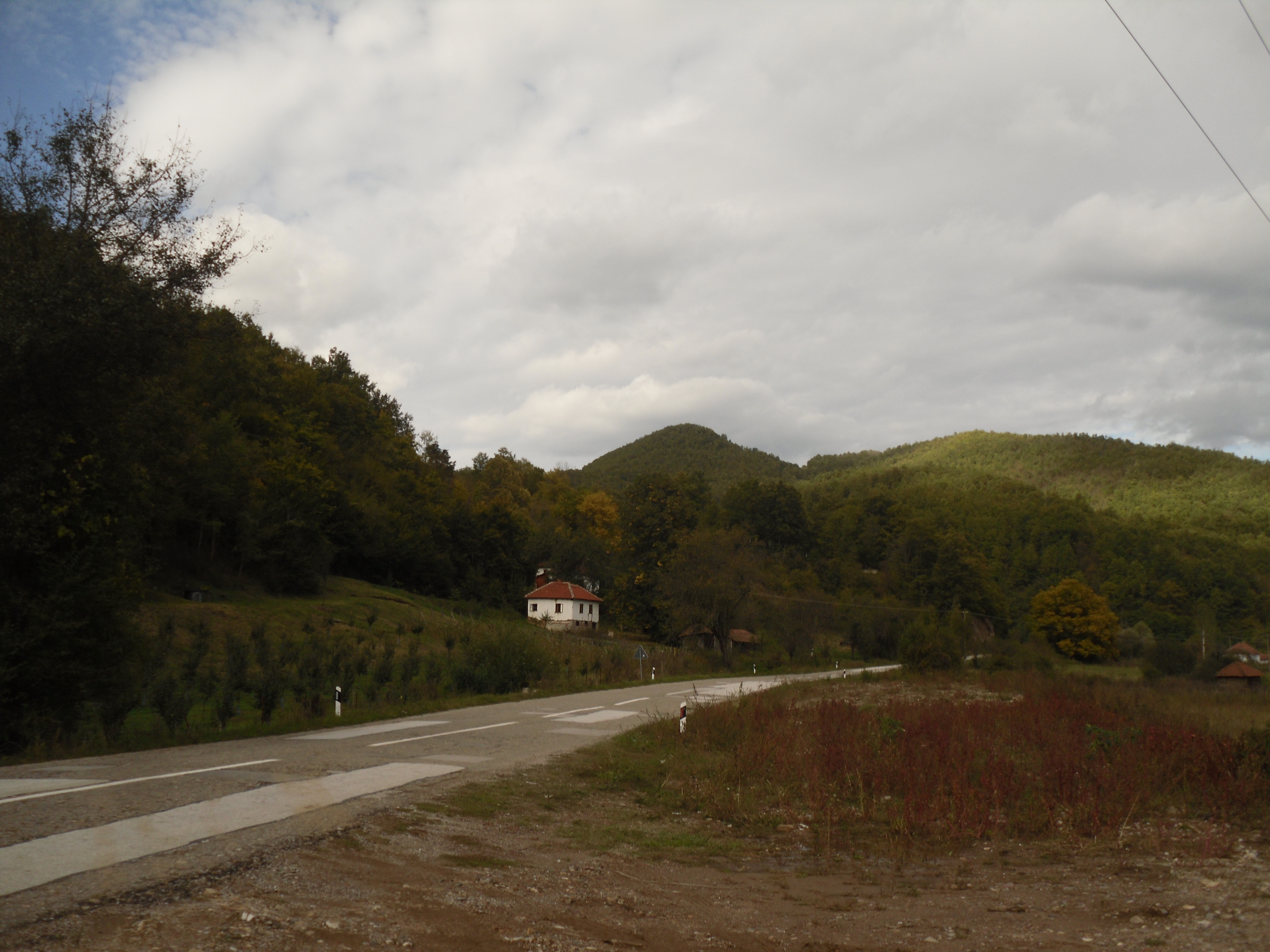

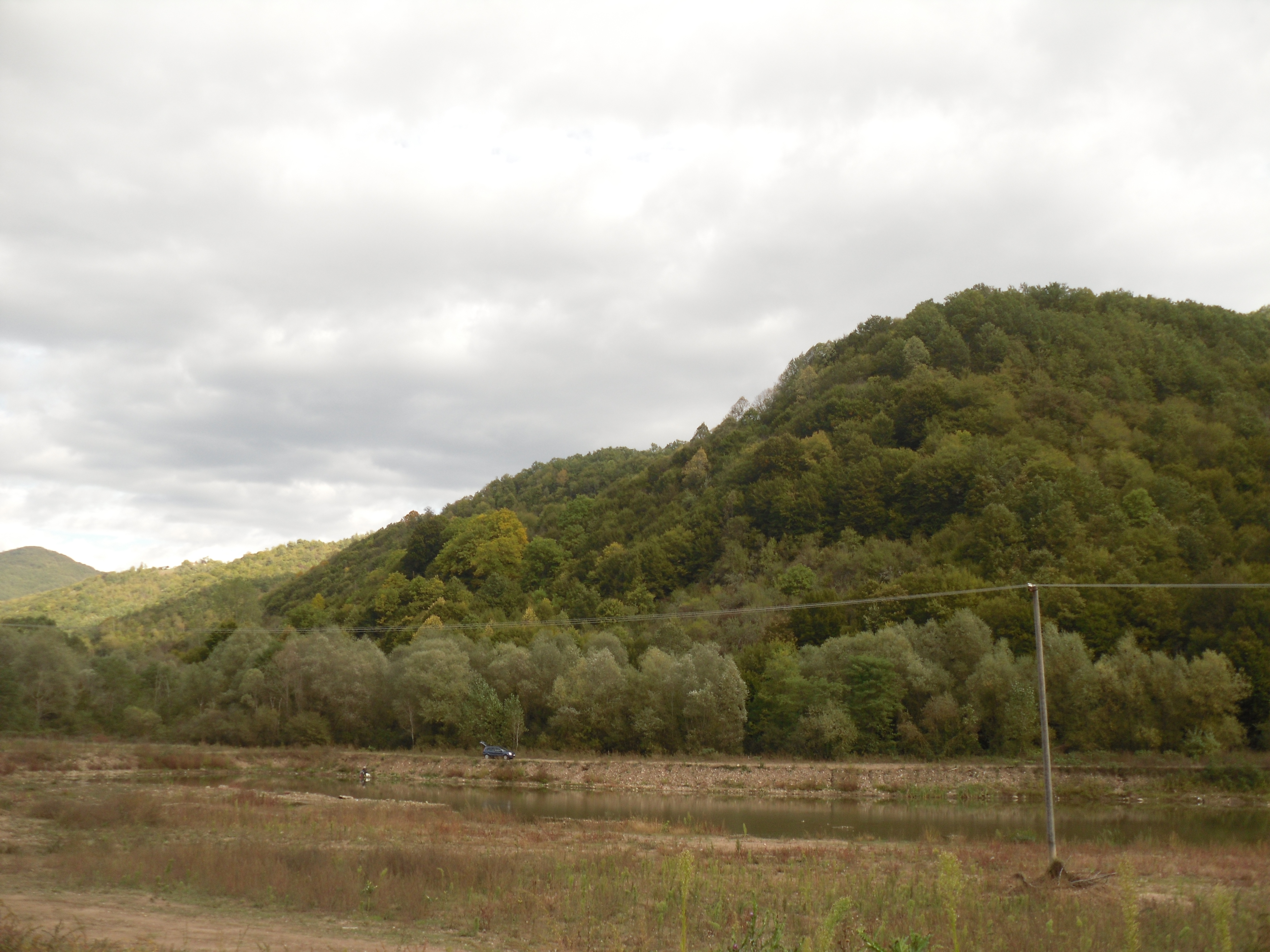
A lake near the village.

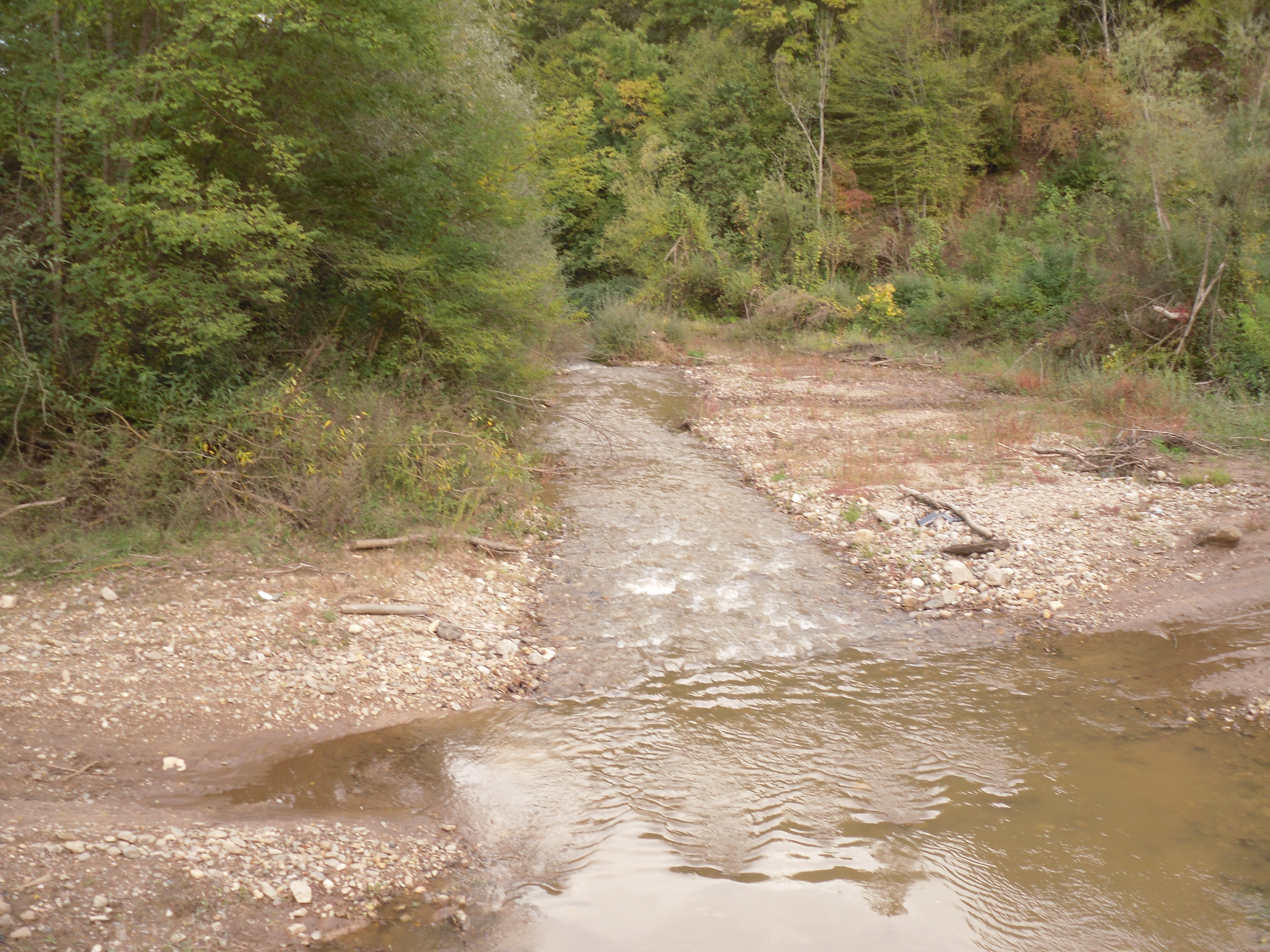
Tularska river.

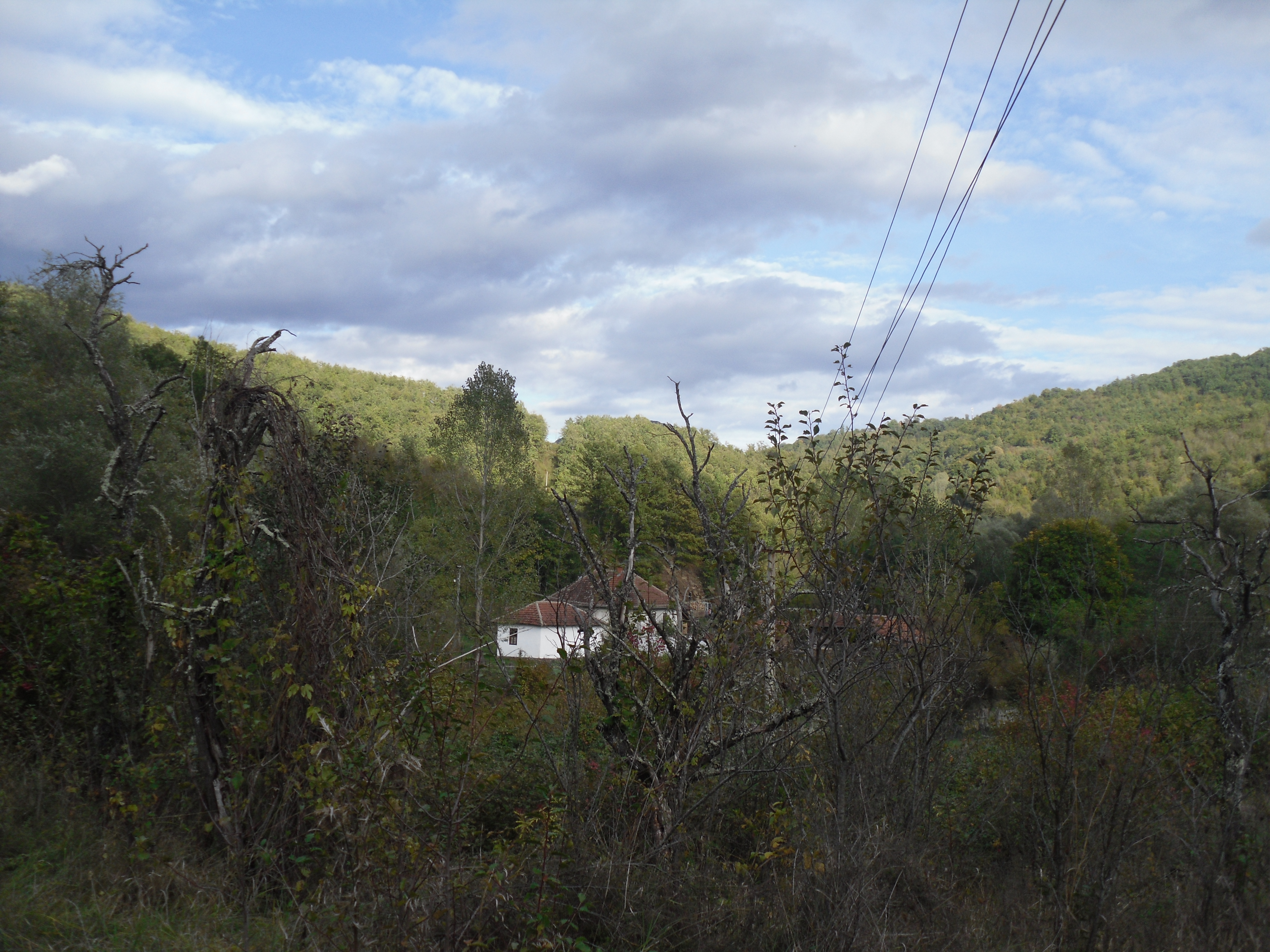

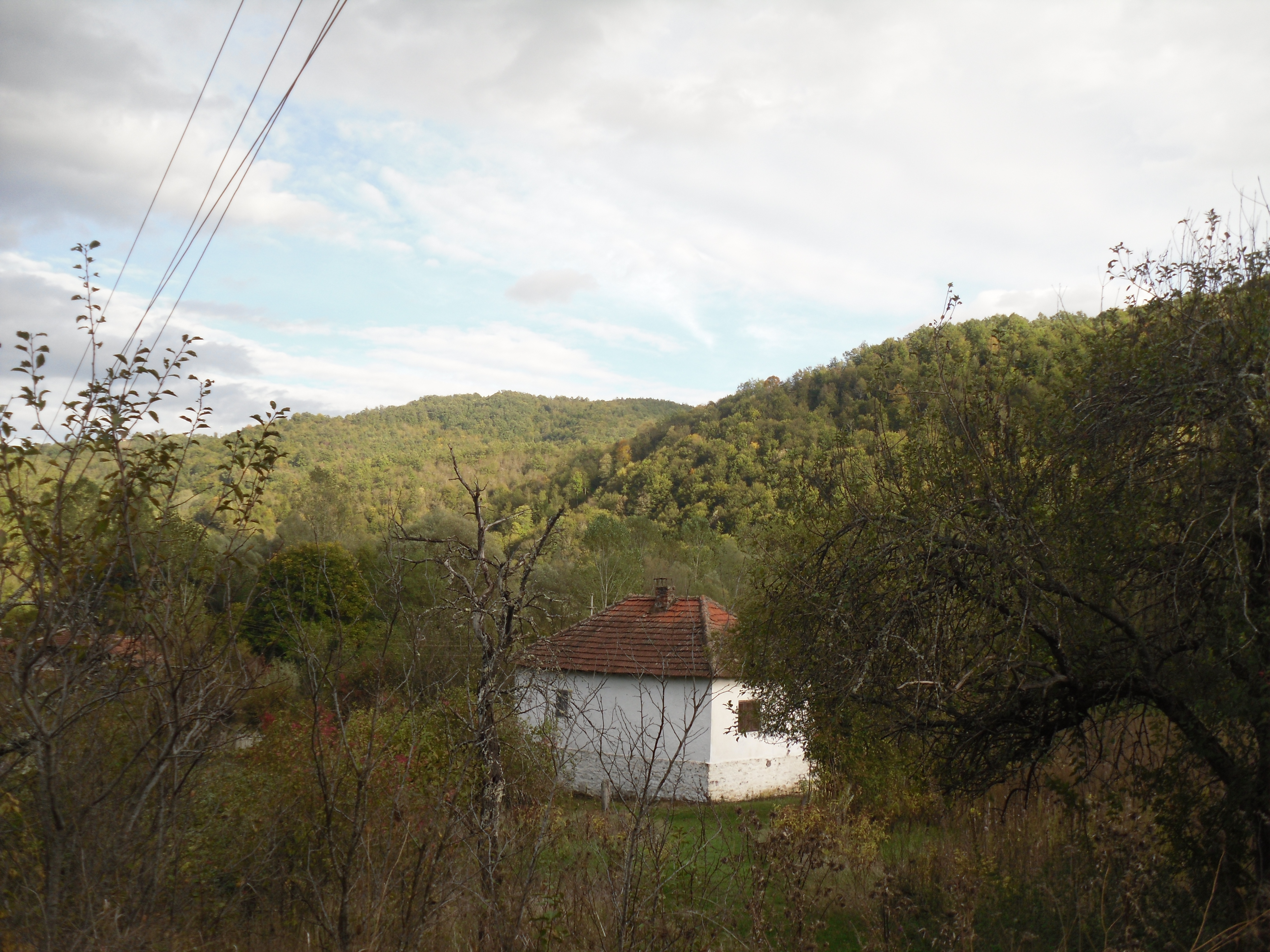

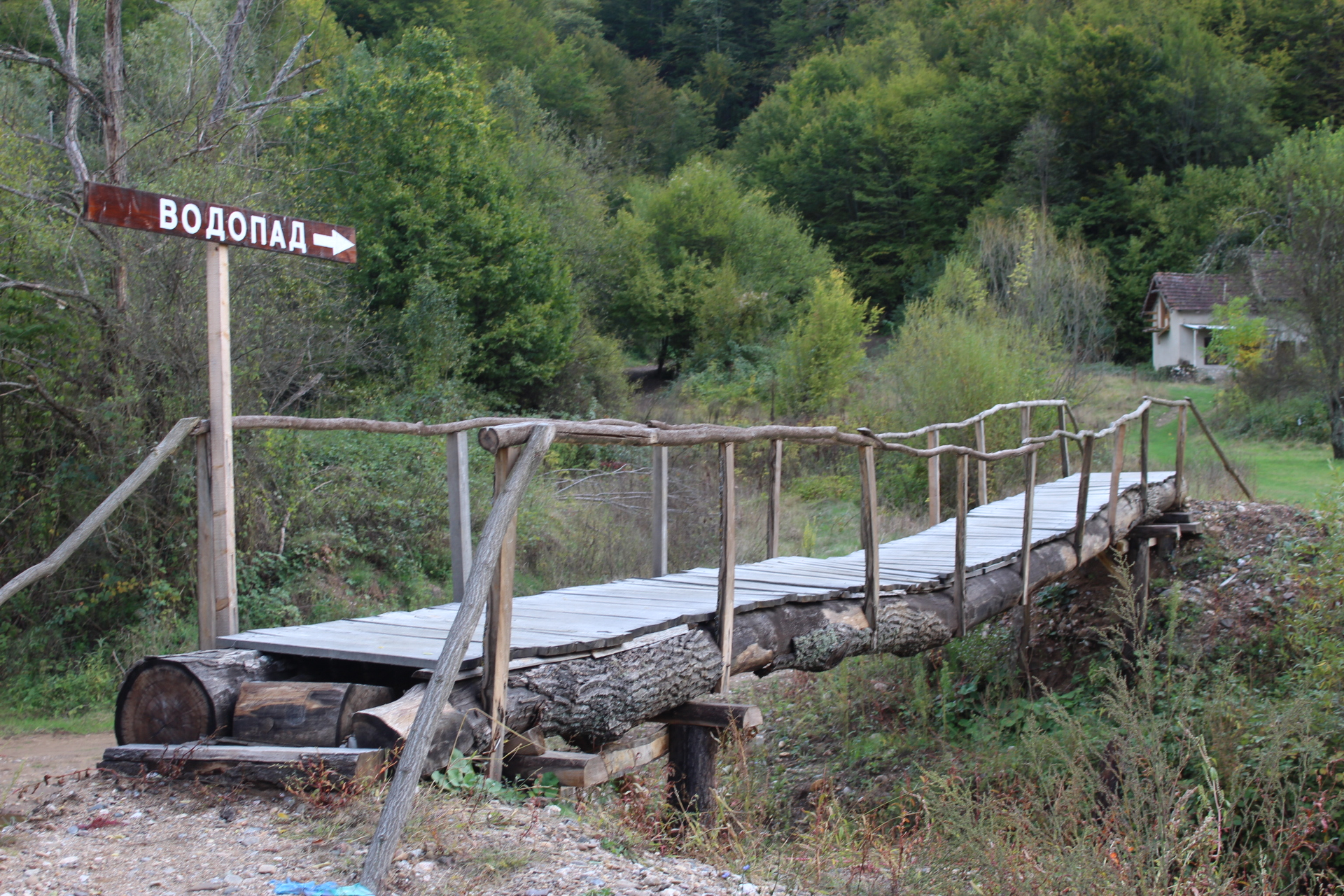
A bridge that leads to the Corov waterfall.

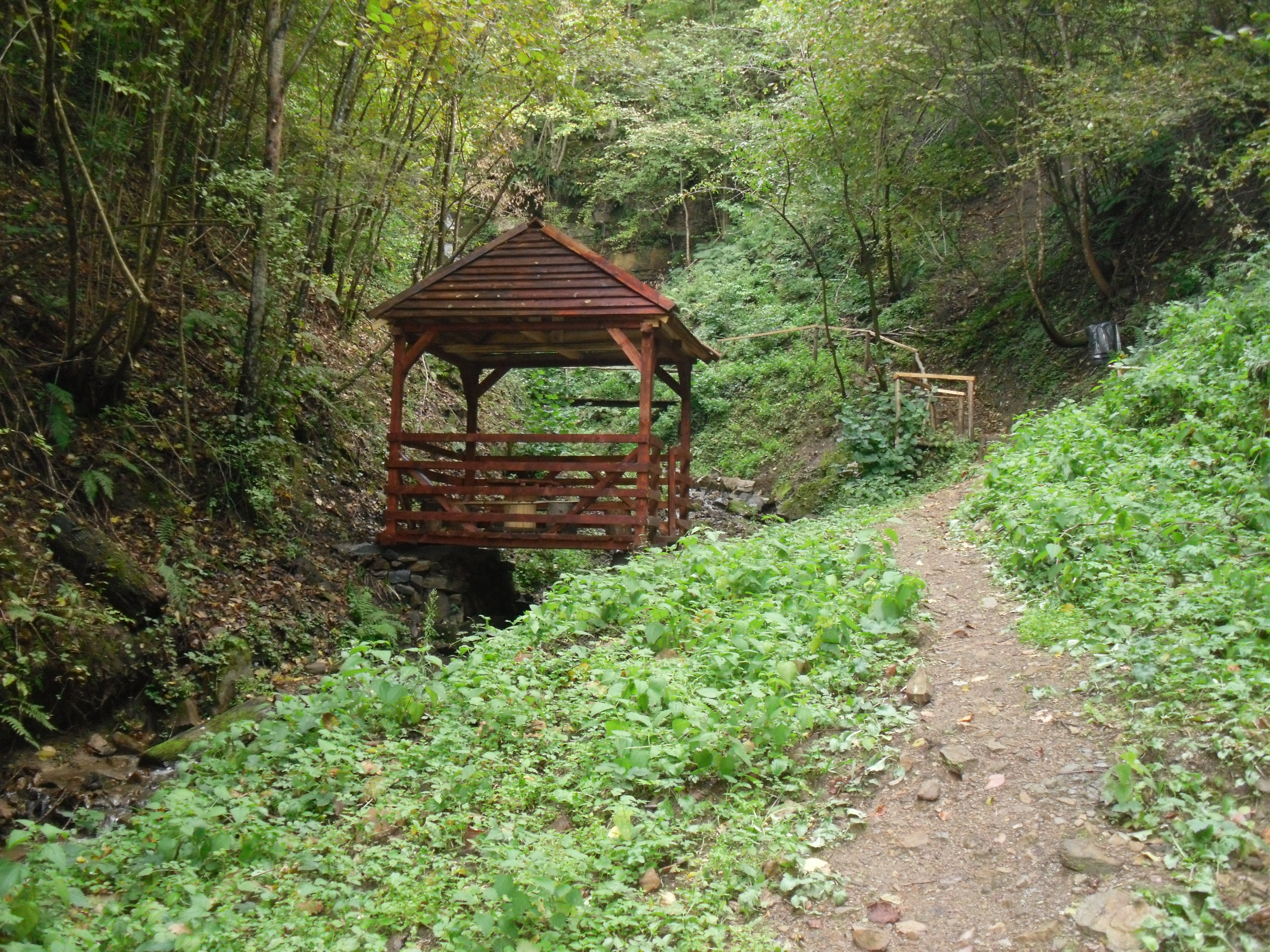
Corov waterfall.

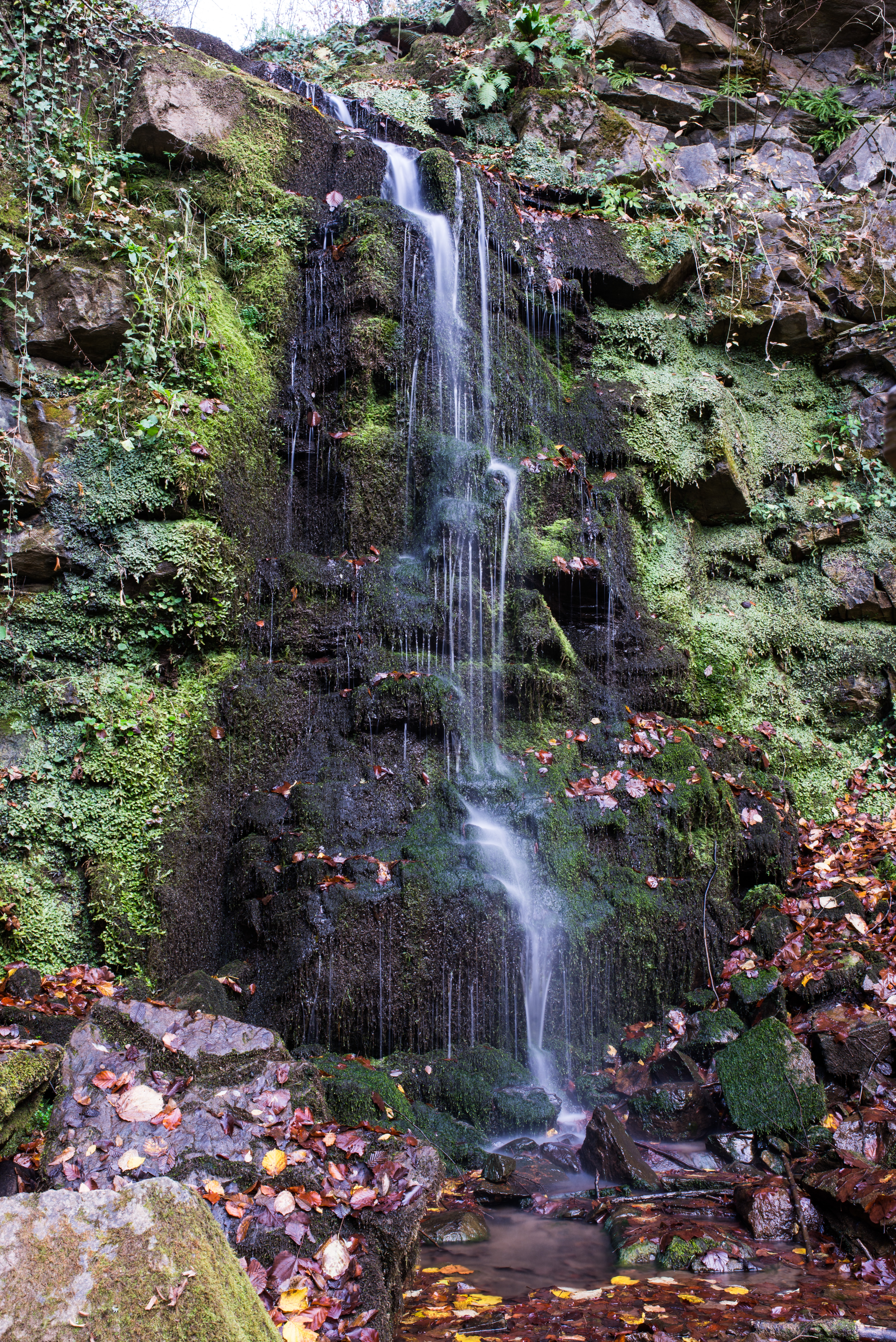
Corov waterfall.

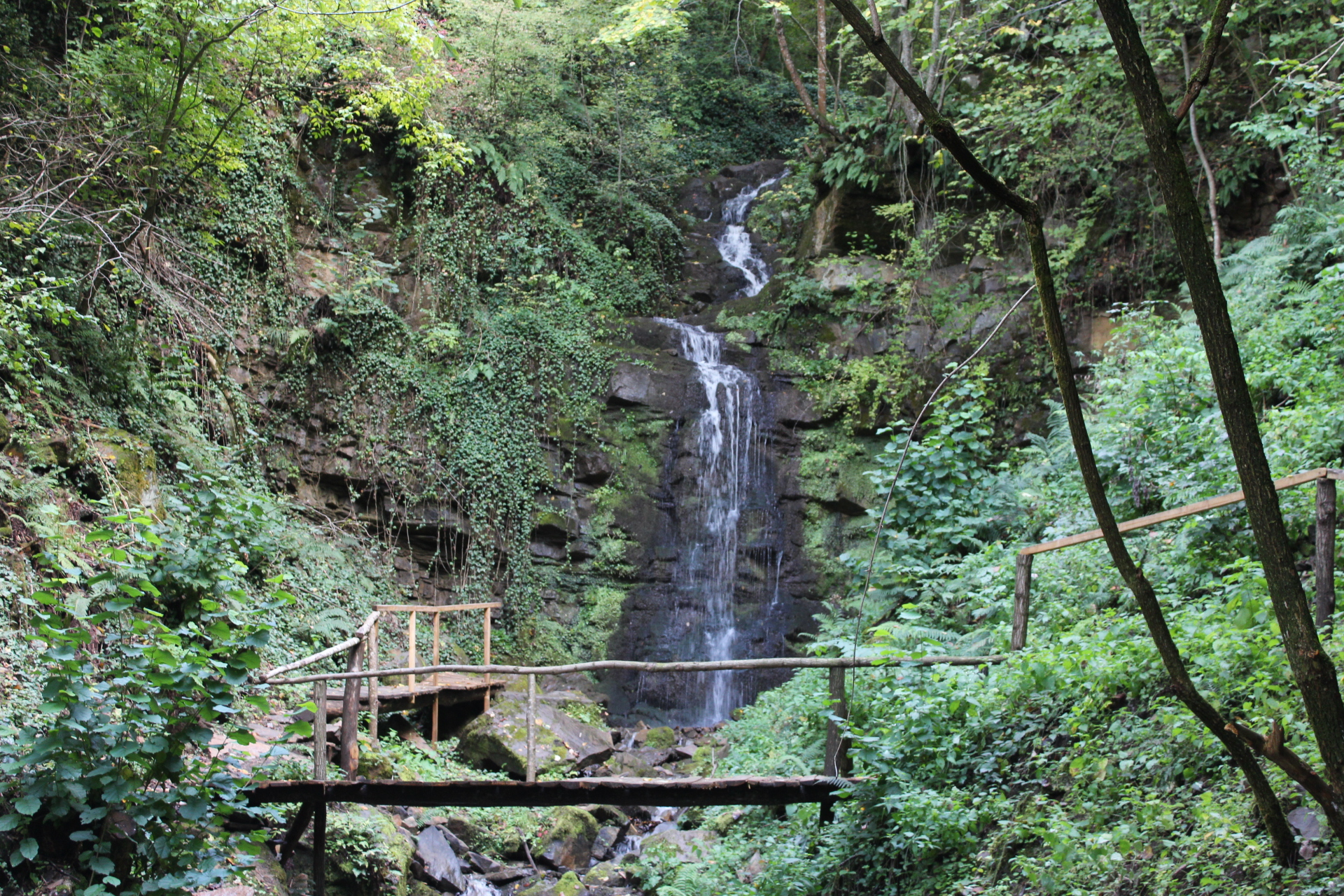
Corov waterfall.

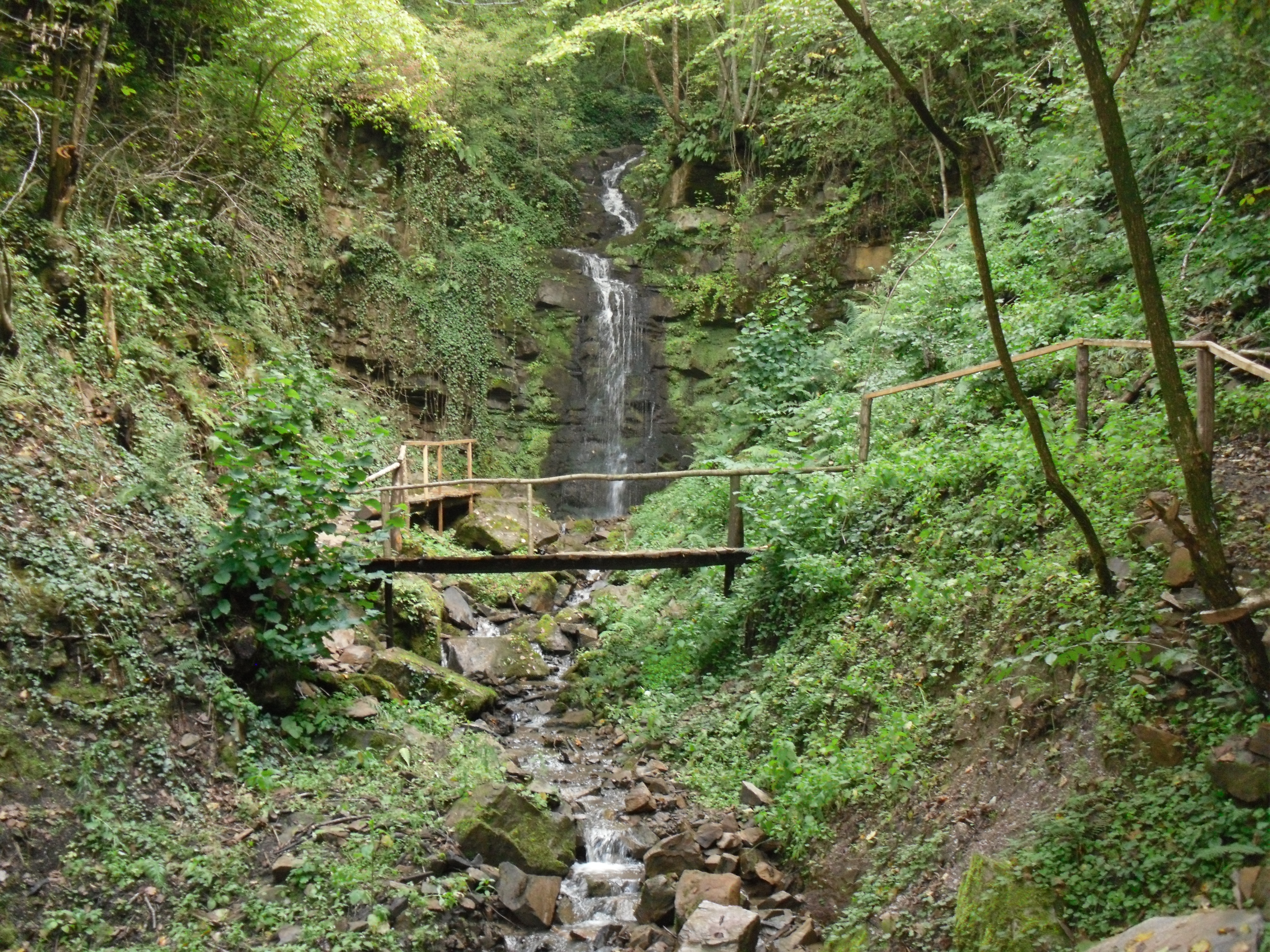
Corov waterfall.

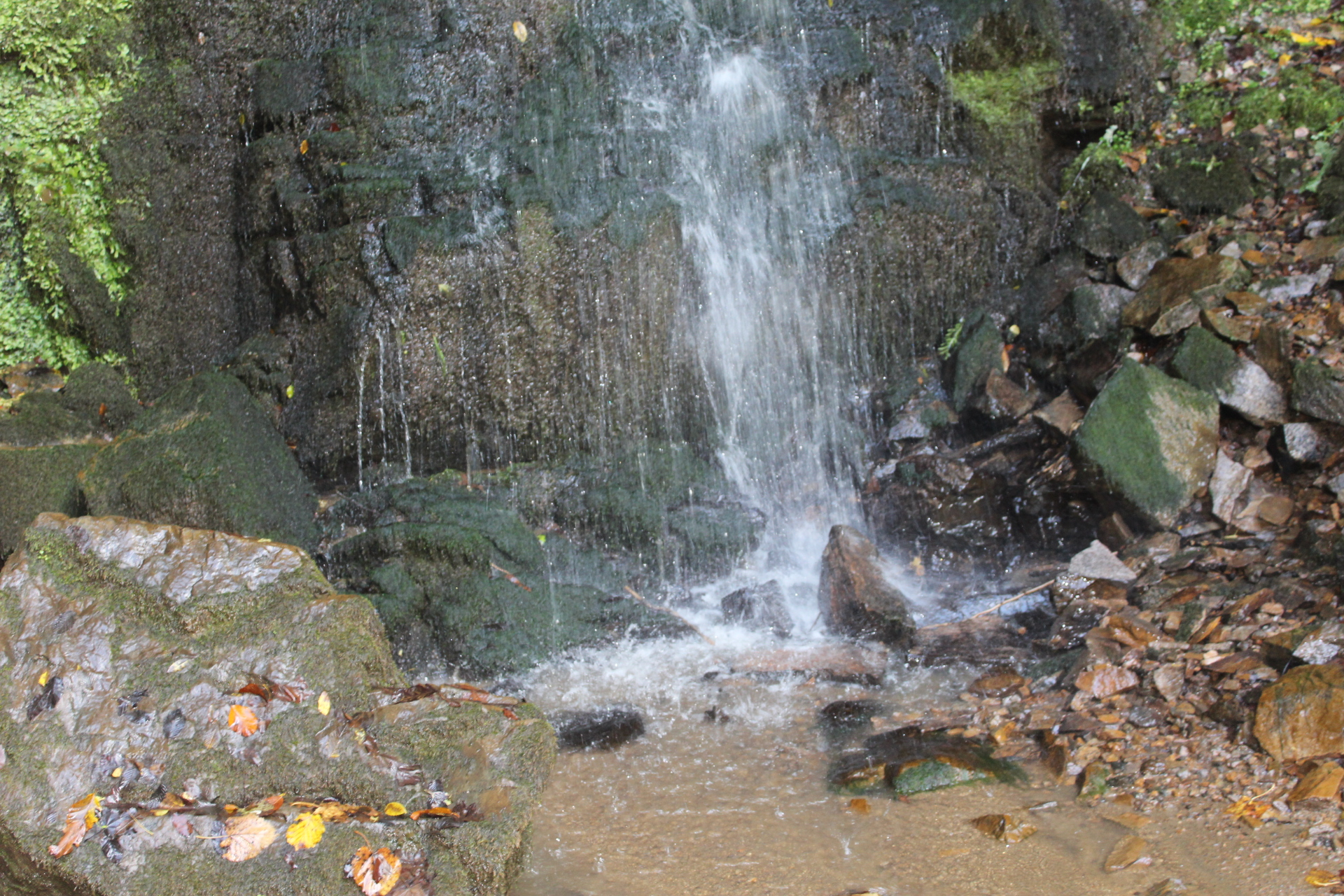
Corov waterfall.

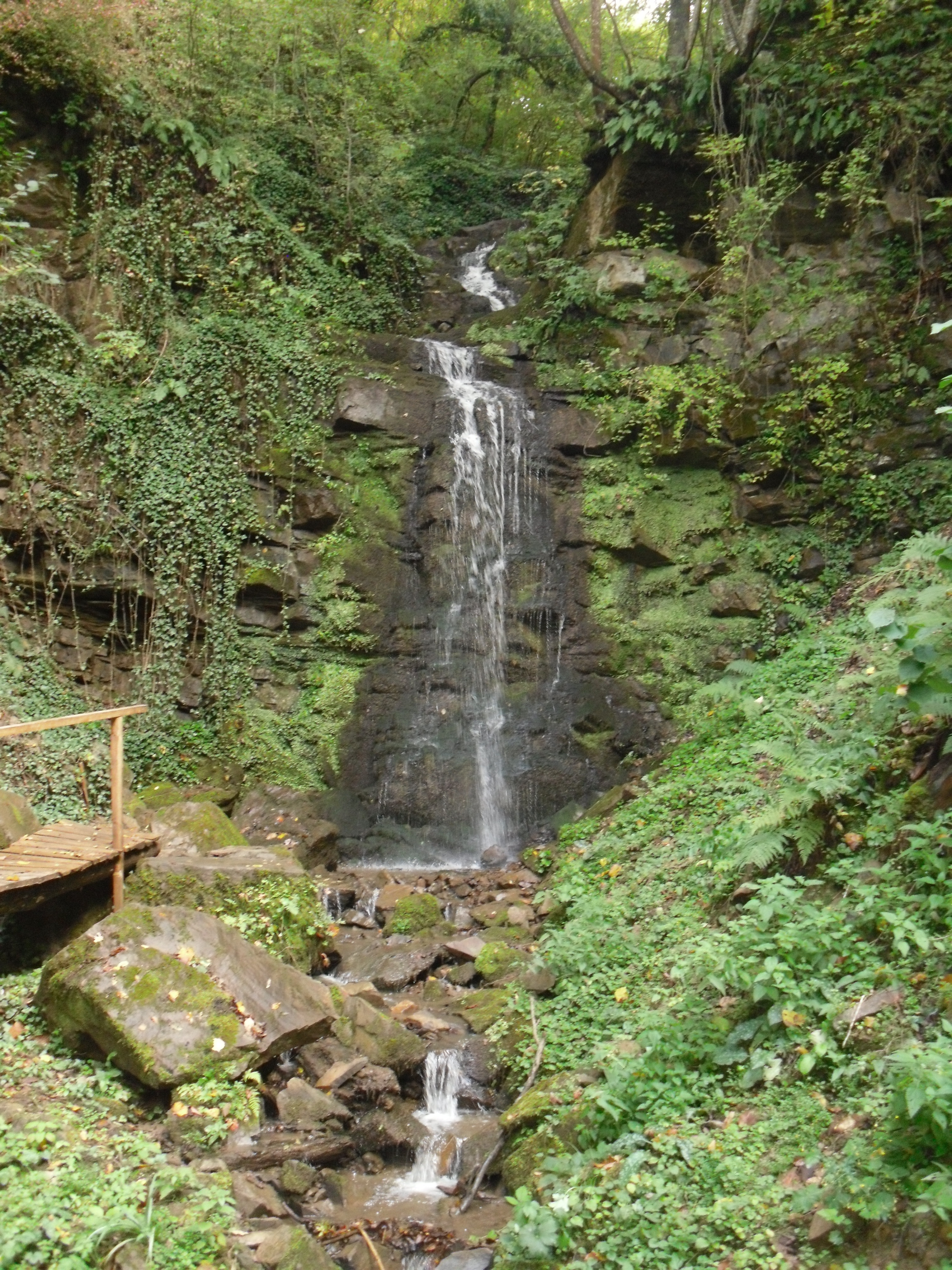
Corov waterfall.

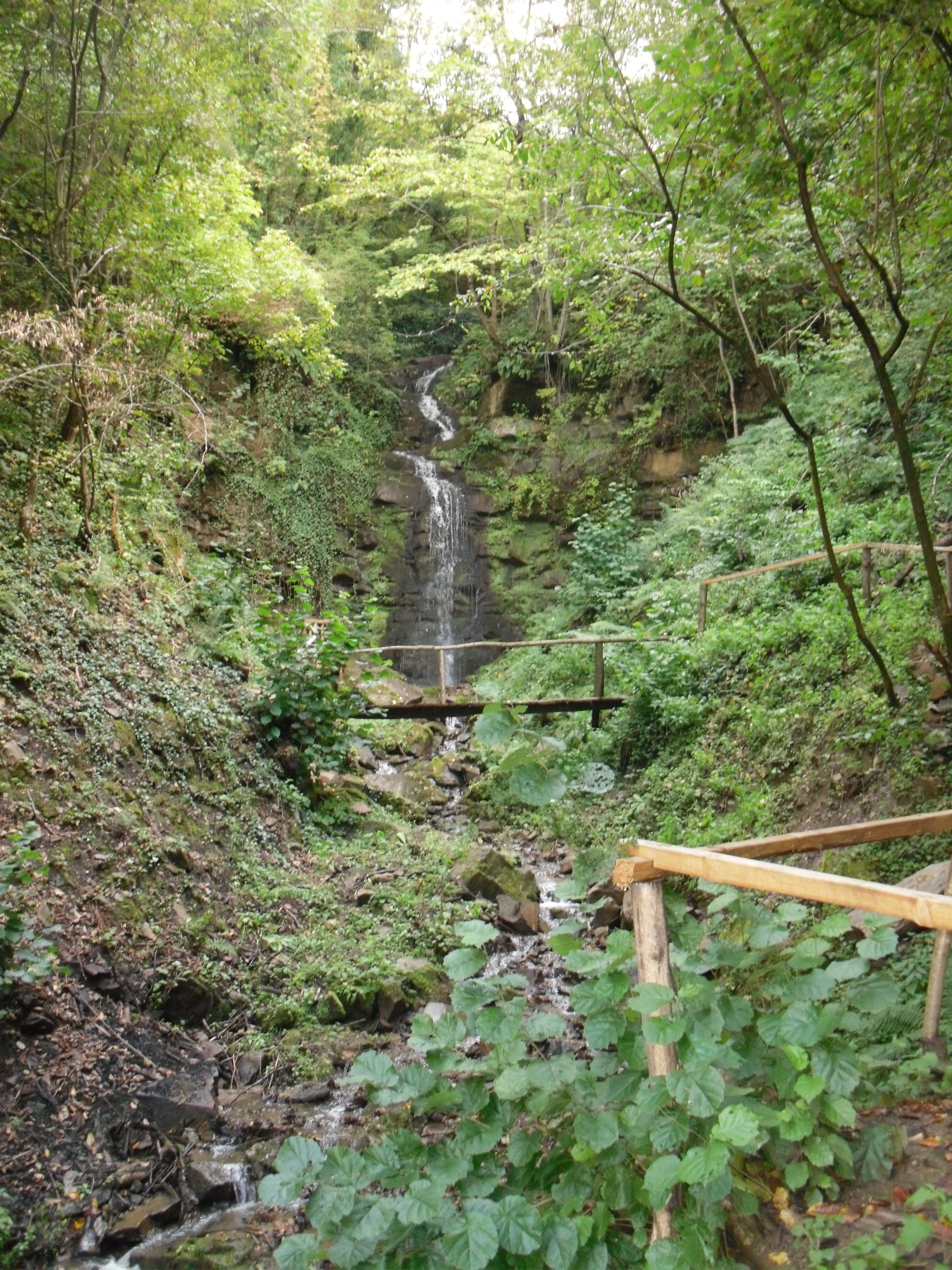
Corov waterfall.

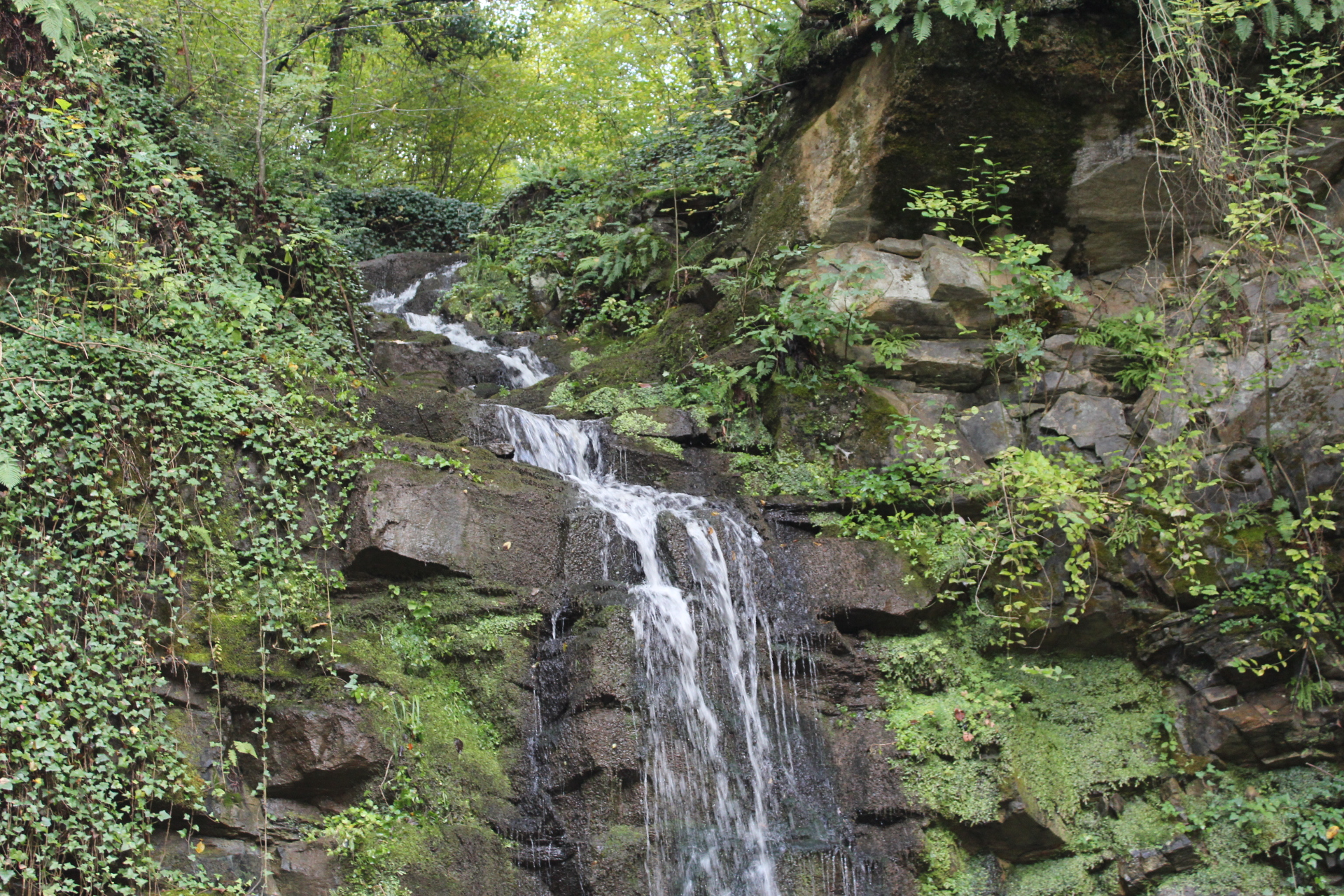
Corov waterfall.

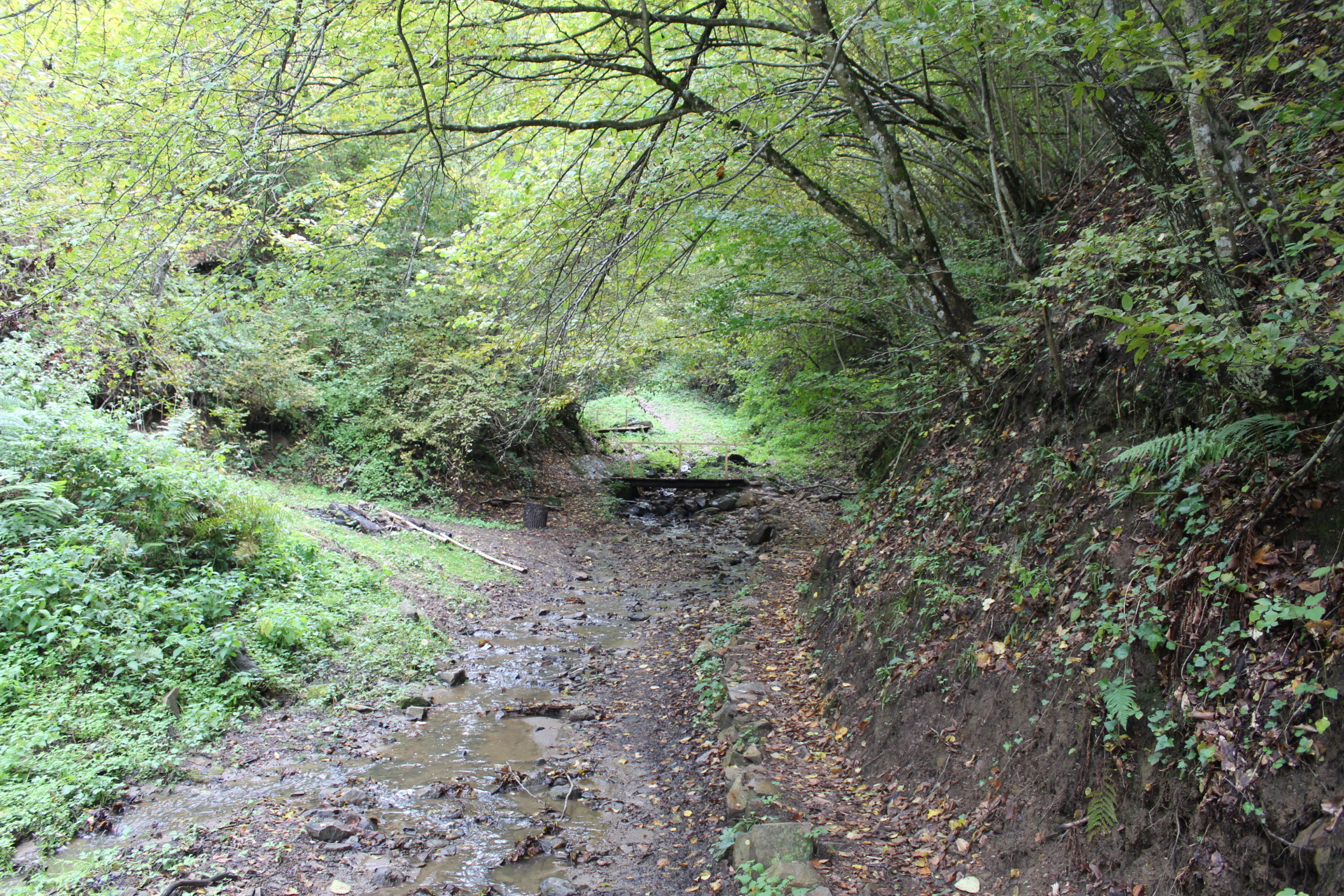
A Corov's stream.
