= Ravna Banja =

Ravna Banja Равна Бања (Serbian) Ramabajë
- Village
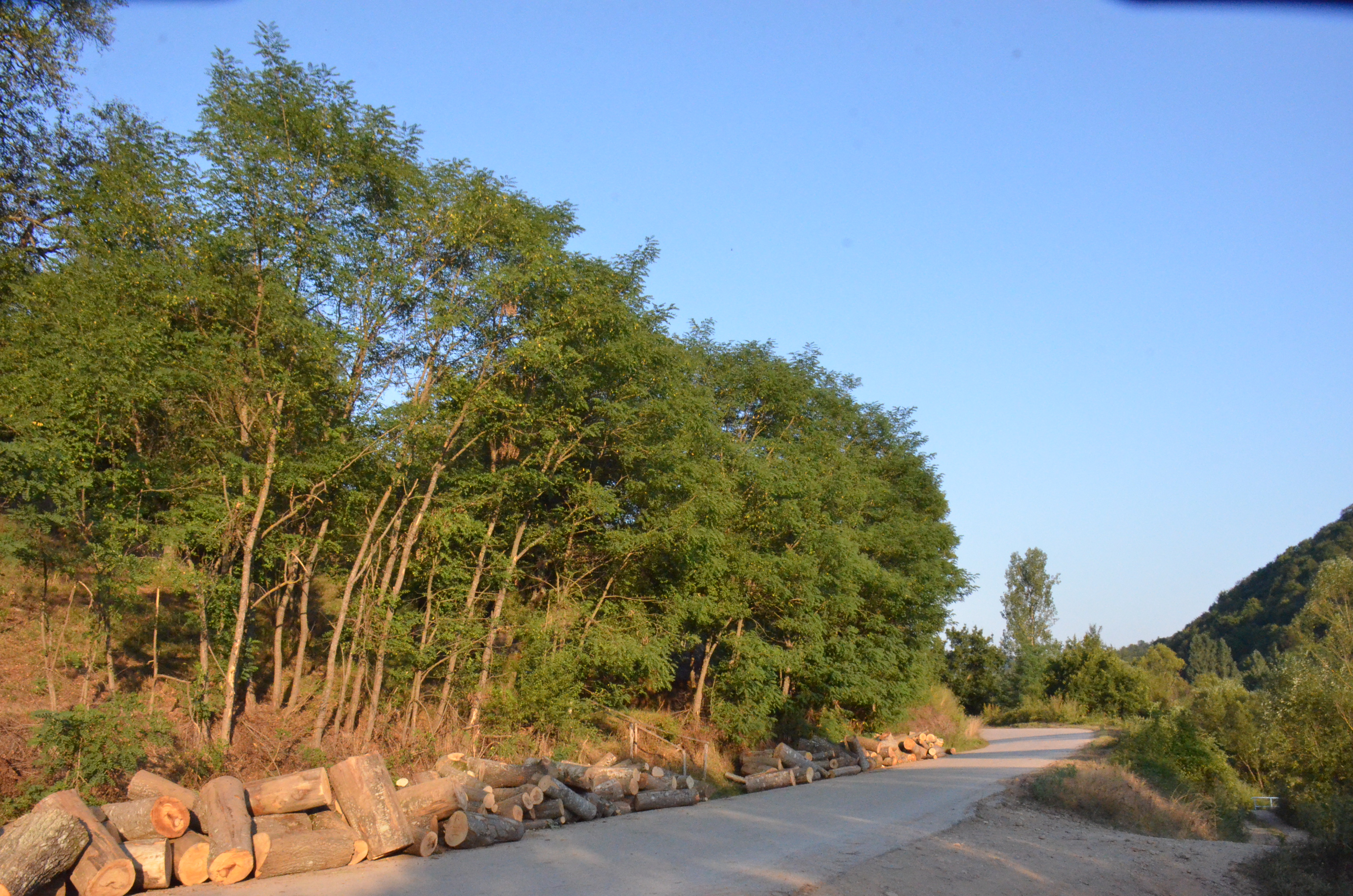

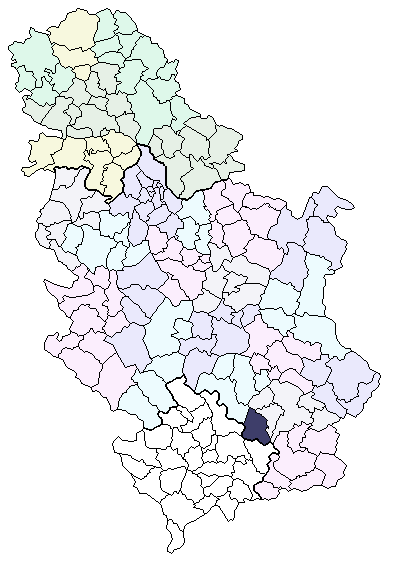
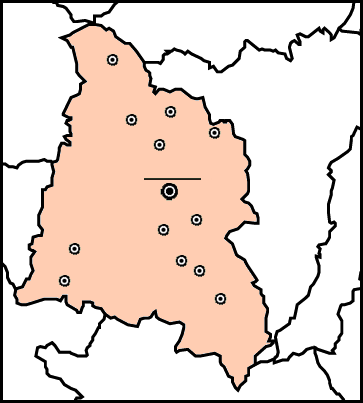
- Location of the municipality of Medveđa within Serbia Location of Ravna Banja within Medveđa

- Location within Serbia
- Coordinates: 42°44′48″N 21°39′22″E
- Country: Serbia
- District: Jablanica District
- Municipality: Medveđa

Population (2002)
  - Total: 364
- Time zone: UTC+1 (CET)
  - Summer (DST): UTC+2 (CEST)

Ravna Banja (Albanian: Ramabajë) is a village in the municipality of Medveđa, Serbia. According to the 2002 census, the village has a population of 364 people. Of these, 205 (56,31 %) were Serbs, 153 (42,03 %) were ethnic Albanians, 1 (0,27 %) Montenegrin, 1 (0,27 %) Bulgarian, and 4 others.
