= Kapit, Medveđa =

Kapit Капит (Serbian) Kapiti (Albanian)
- Village
- Location within Serbia
- Coordinates: 42.8336°N 21.6267°E
- Country: Serbia
- District: Jablanica District
- Municipality: Medveđa

Population (2002)
  - Total: 253
- Time zone: UTC+1 (CET)
  - Summer (DST): UTC+2 (CEST)

Kapit (Serbian Cyrillic: Капит) is a village in the municipality of Medveđa, Serbia. According to the 2002 census, the village has a population of 253 people. Of these, 245 (96,83 %) were ethnic Albanians, 6 (2,37 %) were Serbs, and 2 (0,79 %) others.
