= Sijarina =

Sijarina Сијарина (Serbian) Siarinë (Albanian)
- Village
- Sijarina Mosque

- Location within Serbia
- Coordinates: 42°46′42″N 21°37′00″E
- Country: Serbia
- District: Jablanica District
- Municipality: Medveđa

Population (2002)
  - Total: 359
- Time zone: UTC+1 (CET)
  - Summer (DST): UTC+2 (CEST)

Sijarina (Serbian Cyrillic: Сијарина: Albanian: Siarinë) is a village in the municipality of Medveđa, Serbia. According to the 2002 census, the village has a population of 359 people. Of these, 272 (75,76 %) were ethnic Albanians, 73 (20,33 %) were Serbs, 9 (2,50 %) Romani, 3 (0,83 %) Montenegrins, and 2 (0,55 %) others.
