= Donji Bučumet =

Donji Bučumet Доњи Бучумет (Serbian)
- Village
- Location within Serbia
- Coordinates: 42°54′28″N 21°37′05″E
- Country: Serbia
- District: Jablanica District
- Municipality: Medveđa
- Elevation: 1,814 ft (553 m)

Population (2002)
  - Total: 186
- Time zone: UTC+1 (CET)
  - Summer (DST): UTC+2 (CEST)

Donji Bučumet is a village in the municipality of Medveđa, Serbia. According to the 2002 census, the village has a population of 186 people.
