= Gubavce =

Gubavce Губавце (Serbian)
- Village
- Location within Serbia
- Coordinates: 42°45′45″N 21°24′56″E
- Country: Serbia
- District: Jablanica District
- Municipality: Medveđa

Population (2002)
  - Total: 36
- Time zone: UTC+1 (CET)
  - Summer (DST): UTC+2 (CEST)

Gubavce is a village in the municipality of Medveđa, Serbia. According to the 2002 census, the village has a population of 36 people.
