= Maćedonce =

Maćedonce Маћедонце (Serbian)
- Village
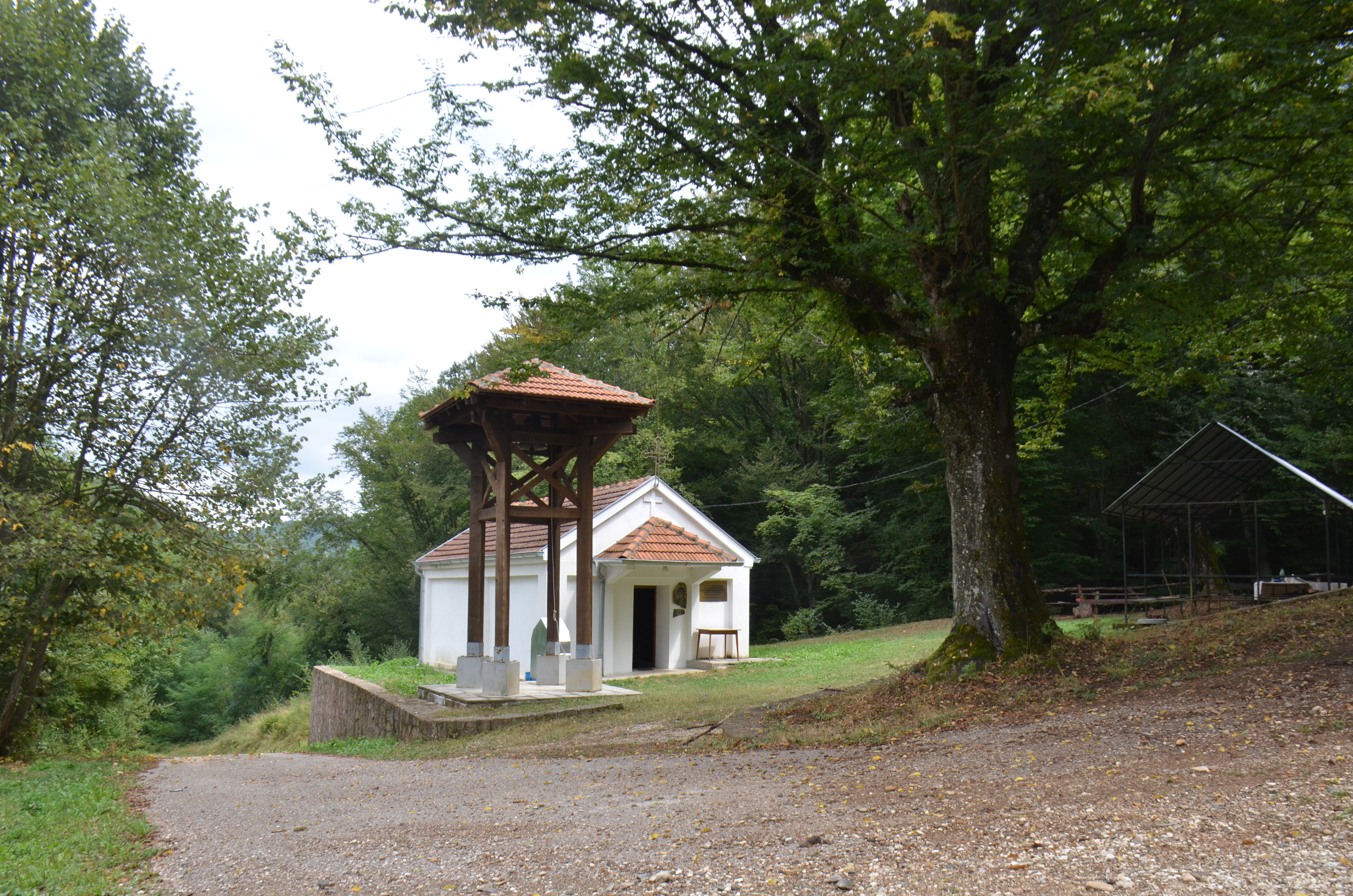

- Location within Serbia
- Coordinates: 42°48′40″N 21°34′00″E
- Country: Serbia
- Region: Southern and Eastern Serbia
- District: Jablanica
- Municipality: Medveđa
- Elevation: 1,350 ft (410 m)

Population (2011)
  - Total: 177
- Time zone: UTC+1 (CET)
  - Summer (DST): UTC+2 (CEST)

Maćedonce is a village in the municipality of Medveđa, Serbia. According to the 2011 census, the village has a population of 177 inhabitants.

== Population ==
Population of Maćedonce
1948	1953	1961	1971	1981	1991	2002	2011
705	757	681	498	373	337	236	177
