= Borovac, Medveđa =

Borovac Боровац (Serbian)
- Village
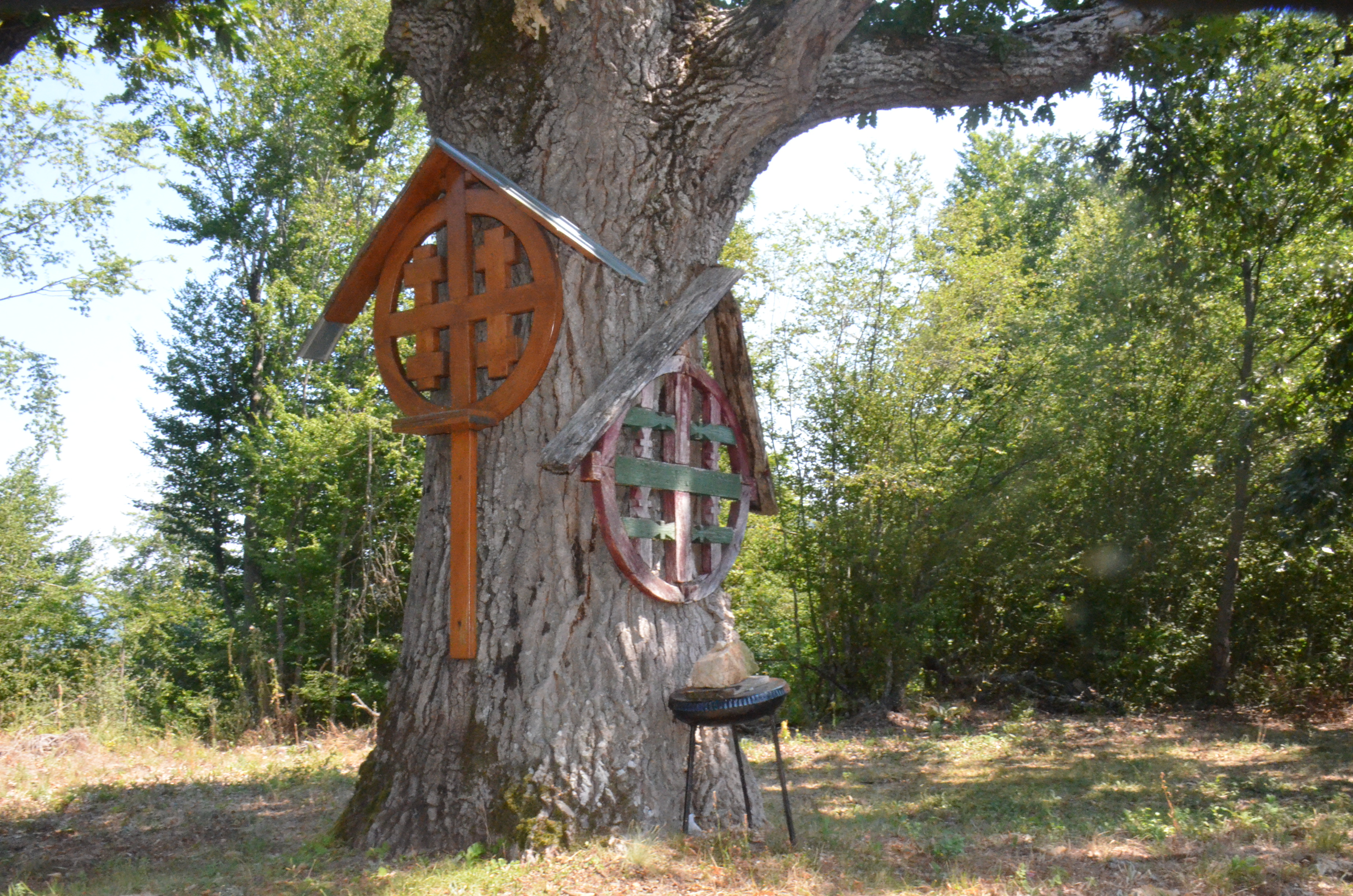

- Location within Serbia
- Coordinates: 42°46′44″N 21°34′22″E
- Country: Serbia
- District: Jablanica District
- Municipality: Medveđa

Population (2002)
  - Total: 59
- Time zone: UTC+1 (CET)
  - Summer (DST): UTC+2 (CEST)

Borovac (Serbian Cyrillic: Боровац) is a village in the municipality of Medveđa, Serbia. According to the 2002 census, the village has a population of 59 people.
