= Mala Braina =

Mala Braina Мала Браина (Serbian)
- Village
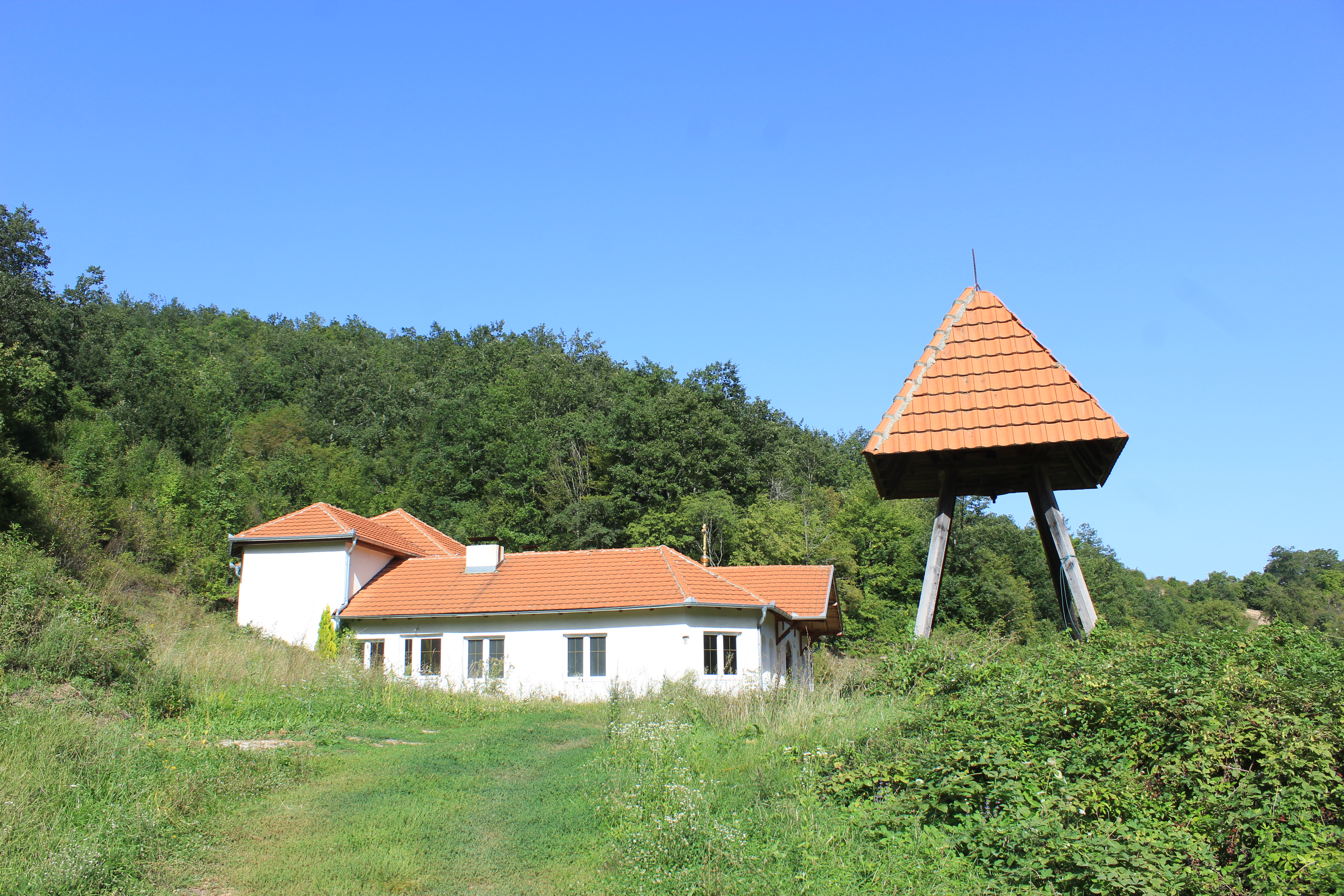

- Location within Serbia
- Coordinates: 42°46′30″N 21°25′03″E
- Country: Serbia
- District: Jablanica District
- Municipality: Medveđa

Population (2002)
  - Total: 13
- Time zone: UTC+1 (CET)
  - Summer (DST): UTC+2 (CEST)

Mala Braina is a village in the municipality of Medveđa, Serbia. According to the 2002 census, the village has a population of 13 people. The author Vojislav Vukotić was born there.
