= Velika Braina =

Velika Braina Велика Браина (Serbian)
- Village
- Location within Serbia
- Coordinates: 42°47′56″N 21°24′49″E
- Country: Serbia
- Region: Southern and Eastern Serbia
- District: Jablanica
- Municipality: Medveđa

Area
  - Total: 11.50 km^{2} (4.44 sq mi)
- Elevation: 781 m (2,562 ft)

Population (2011)
  - Total: 28
  - Density: 2.4/km^{2} (6.3/sq mi)
- Time zone: UTC+1 (CET)
  - Summer (DST): UTC+2 (CEST)

Velika Braina is a village located in the municipality of Medveđa, Serbia. According to the 2011 census, the village has a population of 28 inhabitants.

== Demographics ==
Population of Velika Braina
1948	1953	1961	1971	1981	1991	2002	2011
289	291	231	125	84	59	21	28
