= Đulekare =

Đulekare Ђулекаре (Serbian) Gjylekarë (Albanian)
- Village
- Location within Serbia
- Coordinates: 42°50′07″N 21°39′29″E
- Country: Serbia
- District: Jablanica District
- Municipality: Medveđa

Population (2002)
  - Total: 117
- Time zone: UTC+1 (CET)
  - Summer (DST): UTC+2 (CEST)

Đulekare (Albanian: Gjylekarë) is a village in the municipality of Medveđa, Serbia. According to the 2002 census, the village has a population of 117 people. Of these, 70 (59,82 %) were Serbs, and 47 (40,17 %) were ethnic Albanians.
