= Bogunovac =

Bogunovac Богуновац (Serbian)
- Village
- Location within Serbia
- Coordinates: 42°46′51″N 21°30′43″E
- Country: Serbia
- District: Jablanica District
- Municipality: Medveđa

Population (2002)
  - Total: 89
- Time zone: UTC+1 (CET)
  - Summer (DST): UTC+2 (CEST)

Bogunovac is a village in the municipality of Medveđa, Serbia. According to the 2002 census, the village has a population of 89 people.
