= Marovac =

Village in Jablanica, Serbia

Marovac Маровац (Serbian)
- Village
- Location within Serbia
- Coordinates: 42°43′00″N 21°41′00″E
- Country: Serbia
- Region: Southern and Eastern Serbia
- District: Jablanica
- Municipality: Medveđa

Area
  - Total: 7.3 sq mi (19 km^{2})
- Elevation: 2,270 ft (692 m)

Population (2011)
  - Total: 74
- Time zone: UTC+1 (CET)
  - Summer (DST): UTC+2 (CEST)

Marovac (Serbian Cyrillic: Маровац) is a village in the municipality of Medveđa, Serbia. According to the 2011 census, the village has a population of 74 inhabitants.

== Population ==
Population of Marovac
1948	1953	1961	1971	1981	1991	2002	2011
542	583	547	433	243	141	123	74
