= Medevce =

Medevce Медевце (Serbian)
- Village
- Location within Serbia
- Coordinates: 42°46′14″N 21°27′04″E
- Country: Serbia
- District: Jablanica District
- Municipality: Medveđa

Area
  - Total: 9.17 km^{2} (3.54 sq mi)
- Elevation: 683 m (2,241 ft)

Population (2011)
  - Total: 54
  - Density: 5.9/km^{2} (15/sq mi)
- Time zone: UTC+1 (CET)
  - Summer (DST): UTC+2 (CEST)

Medevce (Serbian Cyrillic: Медевце) is a village in the municipality of Medveđa, Serbia. According to the 2011 census, the village has a population of 54 inhabitants.
