= Gornja Lapaštica =

Gornja Lapaštica Горња Лапаштица (Serbian) Llapashticë e Epërme (Albanian)
- Village
- Location within Serbia
- Coordinates: 42°51′25″N 21°39′23″E
- Country: Serbia
- District: Jablanica District
- Municipality: Medveđa

Population (2002)
  - Total: 194
- Time zone: UTC+1 (CET)
  - Summer (DST): UTC+2 (CEST)

Gornja Lapaštica (Serbian Cyrillic: Горња Лапаштица; Albanian: Llapashticë e Epërme) is a village in the municipality of Medveđa, Serbia. According to the 2002 census, the village has a population of 194 people. Of these, 120 (61,85 %) were ethnic Albanians, 68 (35,05 %) were Serbs, and 4 (2,06 %) others.
