= Grbavce =

Grbavce Грбавце (Serbian) Gërbac (Albanian)
- Village
- Location within Serbia
- Coordinates: 42°42′58″N 21°38′12″E
- Country: Serbia
- District: Jablanica District
- Municipality: Medveđa

Population (2002)
  - Total: 276
- Time zone: UTC+1 (CET)
  - Summer (DST): UTC+2 (CEST)

Grbavce (Serbian Cyrillic: Грбавце; Albanian: Gërbac) is a village in the municipality of Medveđa, Serbia. According to the 2002 census, the village has a population of 276 people. Of these, 275 (99,63 %) were ethnic Albanians, and 1 (0,36 %) other.
