= Stara Banja =

Stara Banja Стара Бања (Serbian)
- Village
- Location within Serbia
- Coordinates: 42°45′06″N 21°37′30″E
- Country: Serbia
- District: Jablanica District
- Municipality: Medveđa

Area
  - Total: 4.3 sq mi (11.2 km^{2})

Population (2002)
  - Total: 91
- Time zone: UTC+1 (CET)
  - Summer (DST): UTC+2 (CEST)

Stara Banja (Albanian: Starabajë) is a village in the municipality of Medveđa, Serbia. According to the 2002 census, the village has a population of 91 people. Of these, 41 (45,05 %) were ethnic Albanians, 36 (39,56 %) were Serbs, 5 (5,49 %) Montenegrins, 1 (1,09 %) Muslim and 8 others.
