= Gurgutovo =

Gurgutovo Гургутово (Serbian)
- Village
- Location within Serbia
- Coordinates: 42°54′04″N 21°39′07″E
- Country: Serbia
- District: Jablanica District
- Municipality: Medveđa

Population (2002)
  - Total: 59
- Time zone: UTC+1 (CET)
  - Summer (DST): UTC+2 (CEST)

Gurgutovo is a village in the municipality of Medveđa, Serbia. According to the 2002 census, the village has a population of 59 people.
