= Medveđa =

Medveđa Медвеђа (Serbian) Medvegja (Albanian)
- Town and municipality
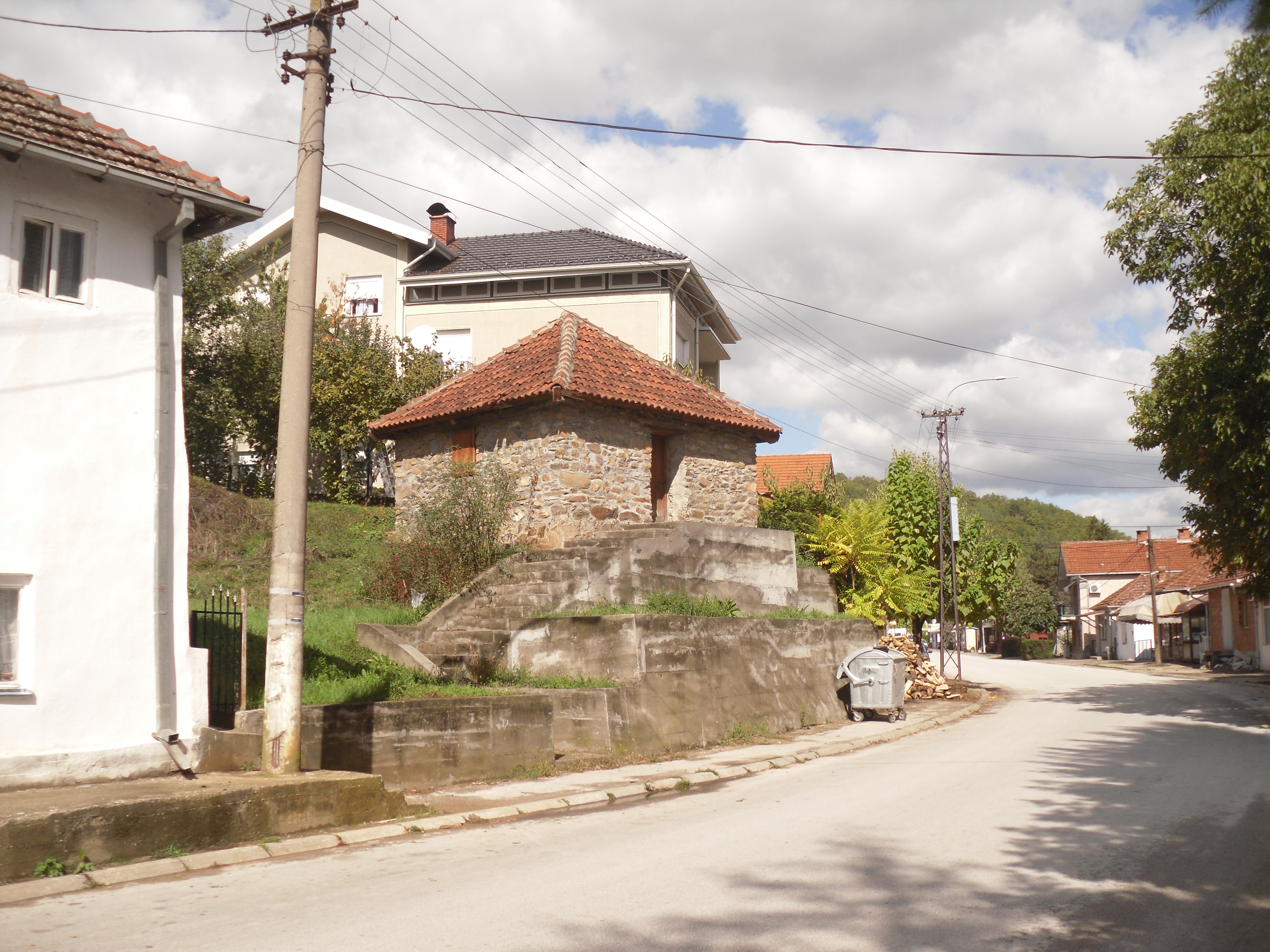
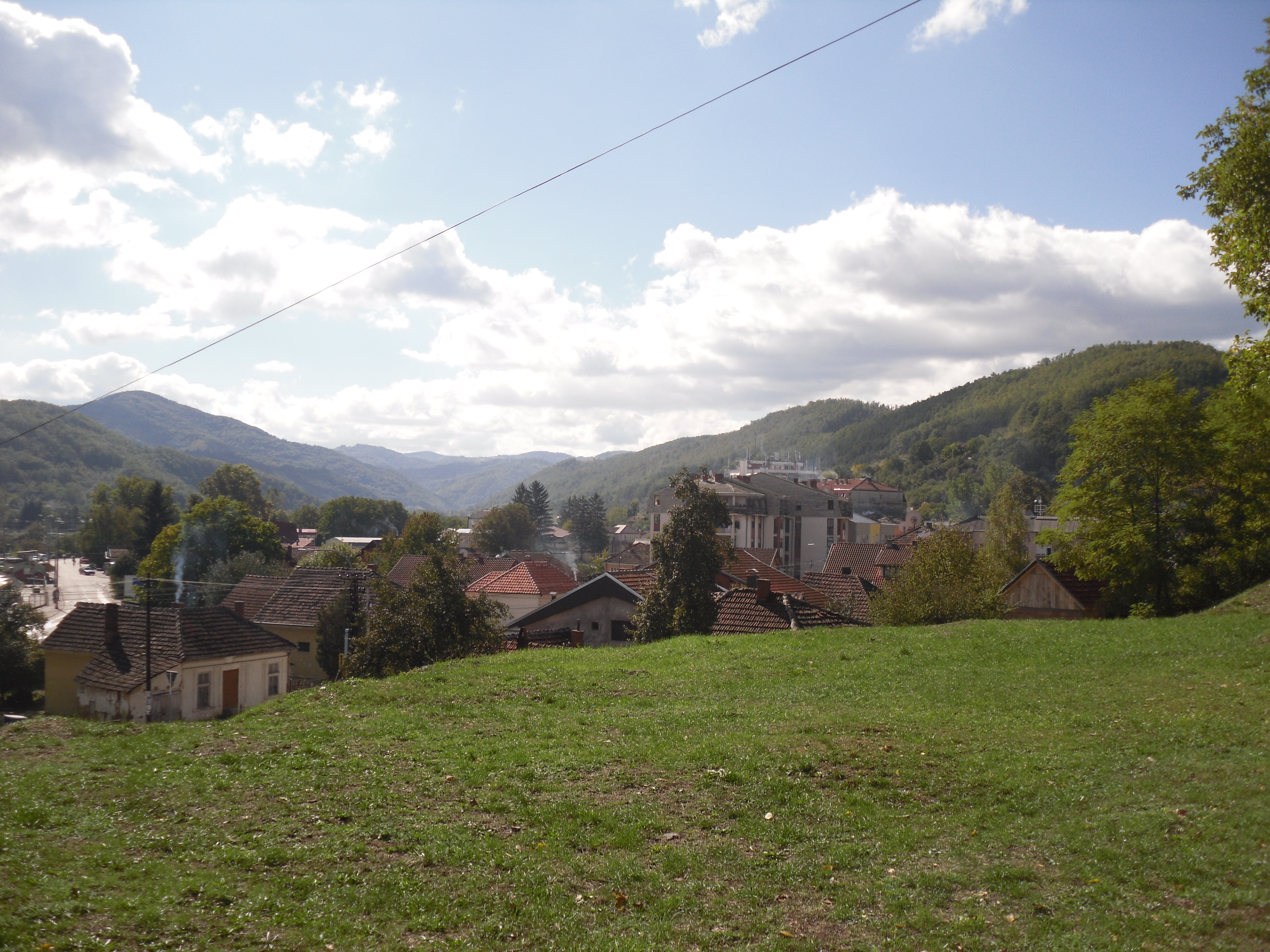
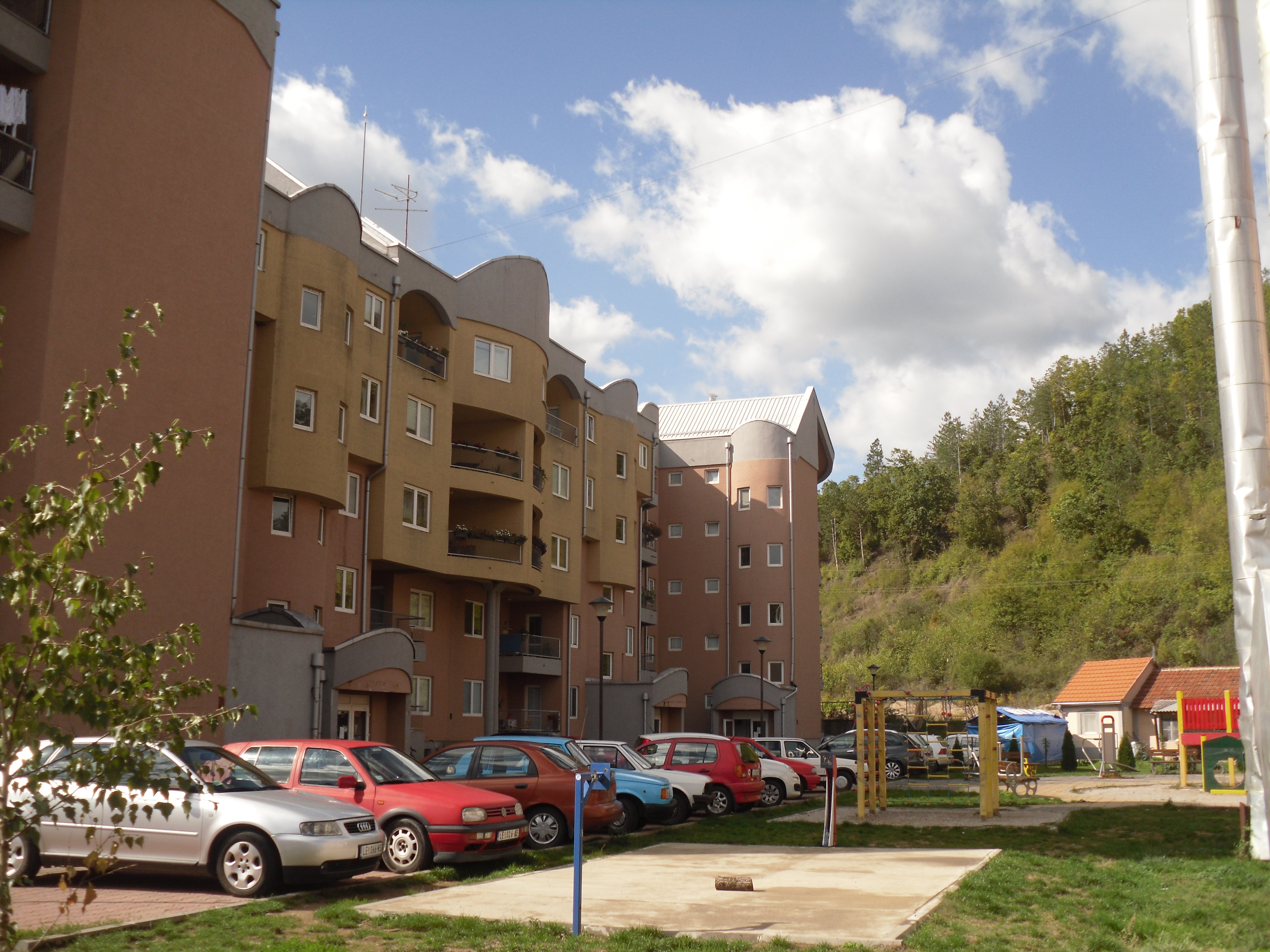
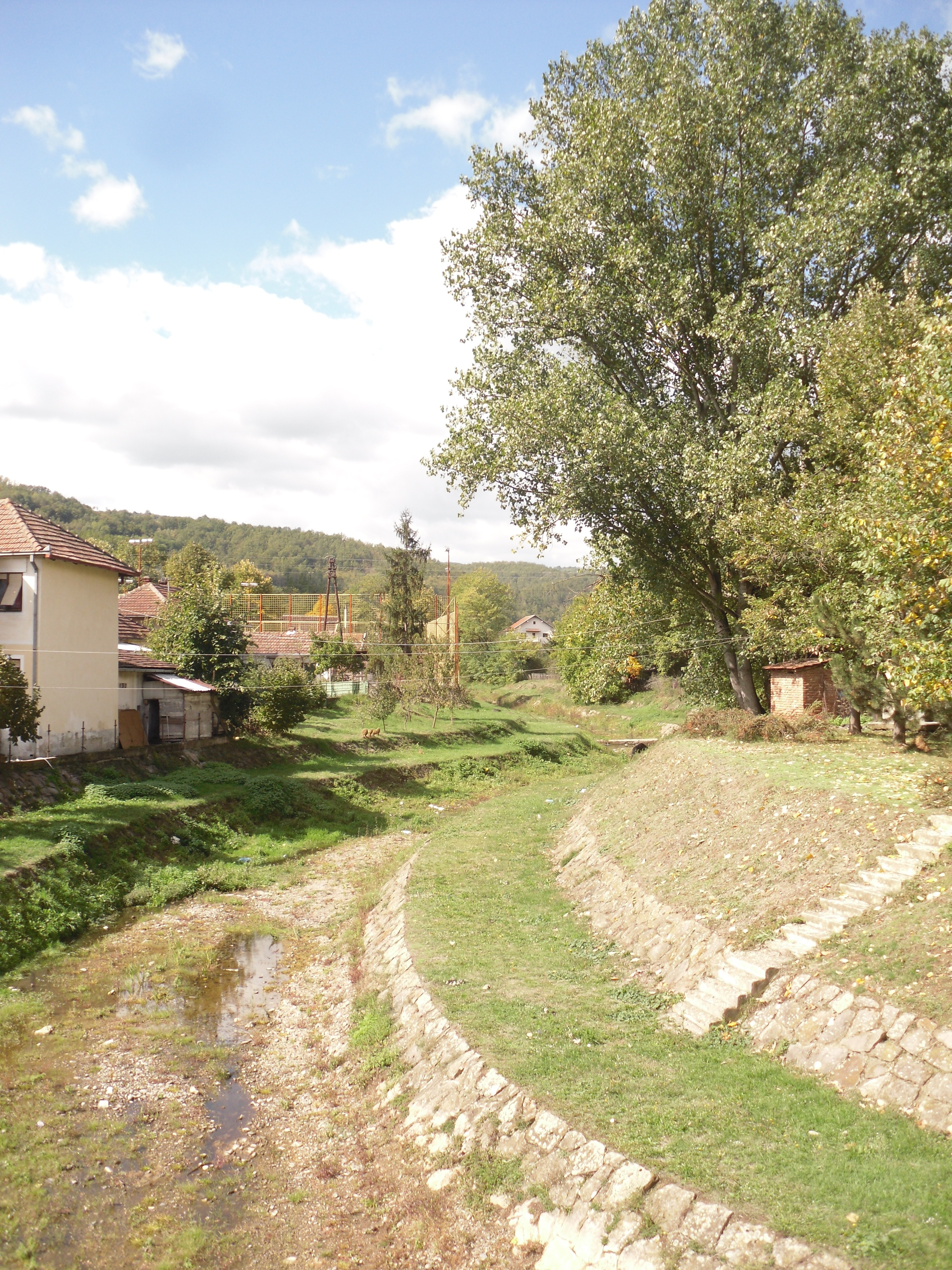
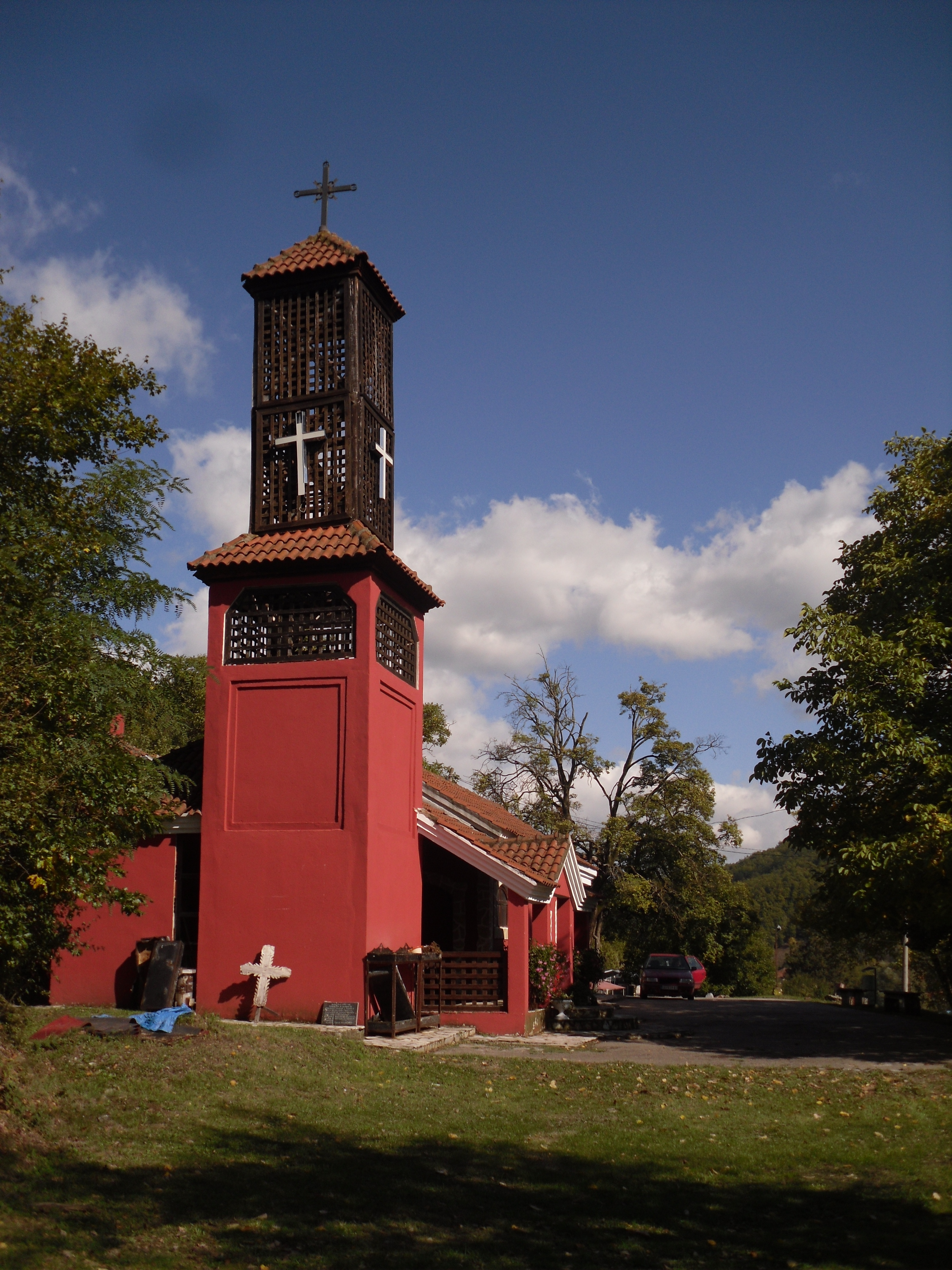
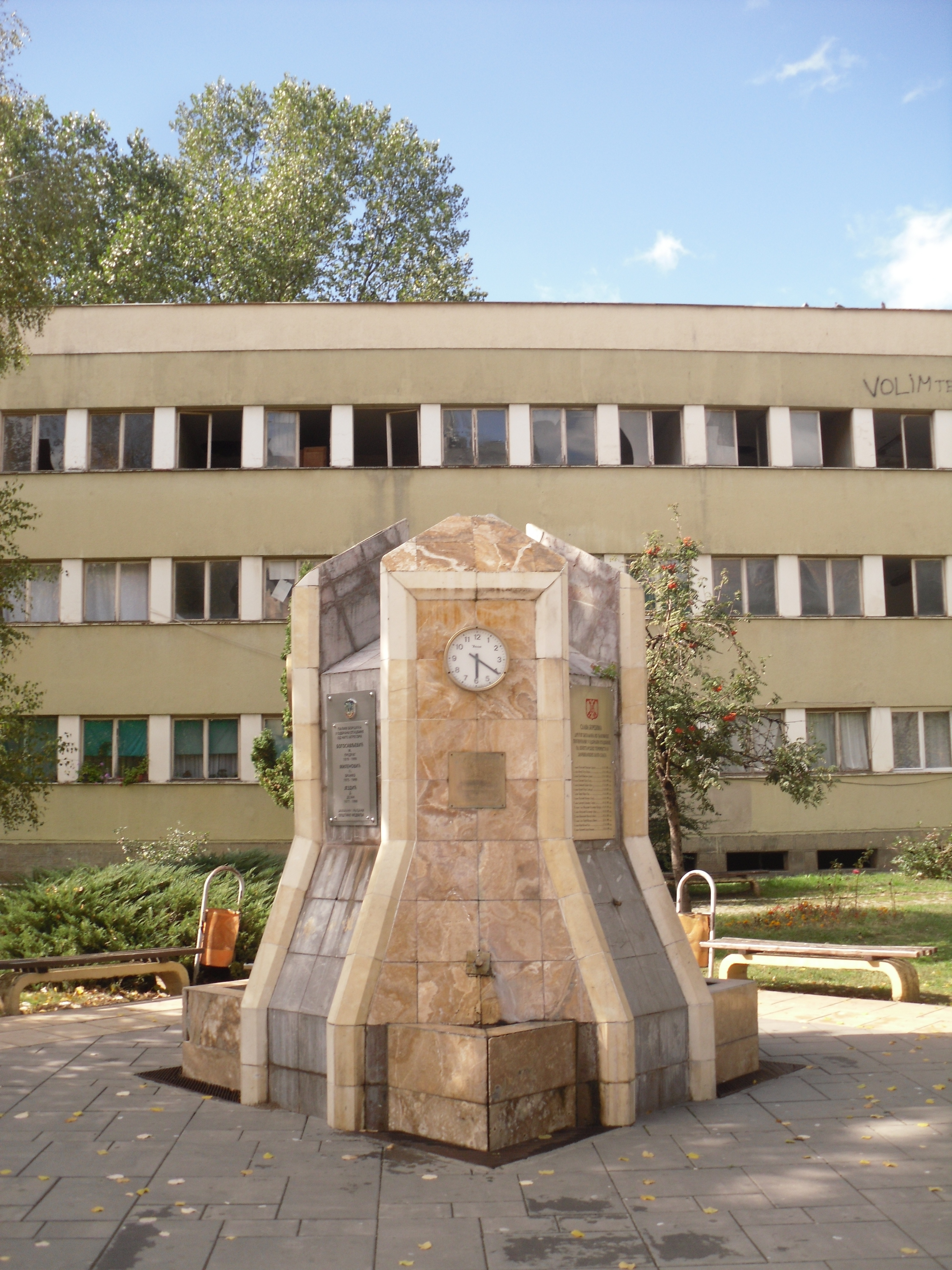

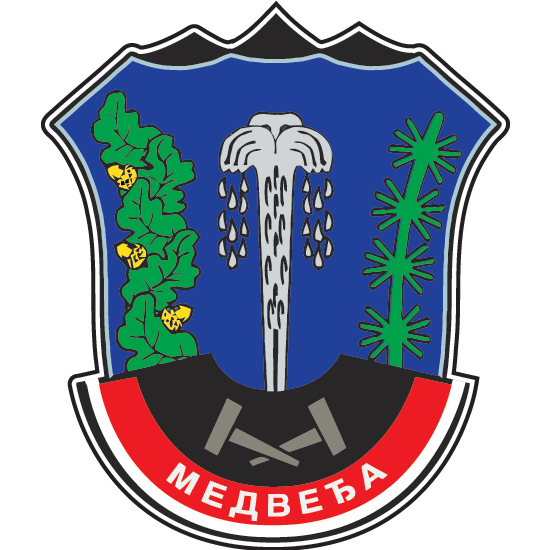
- Coat of arms

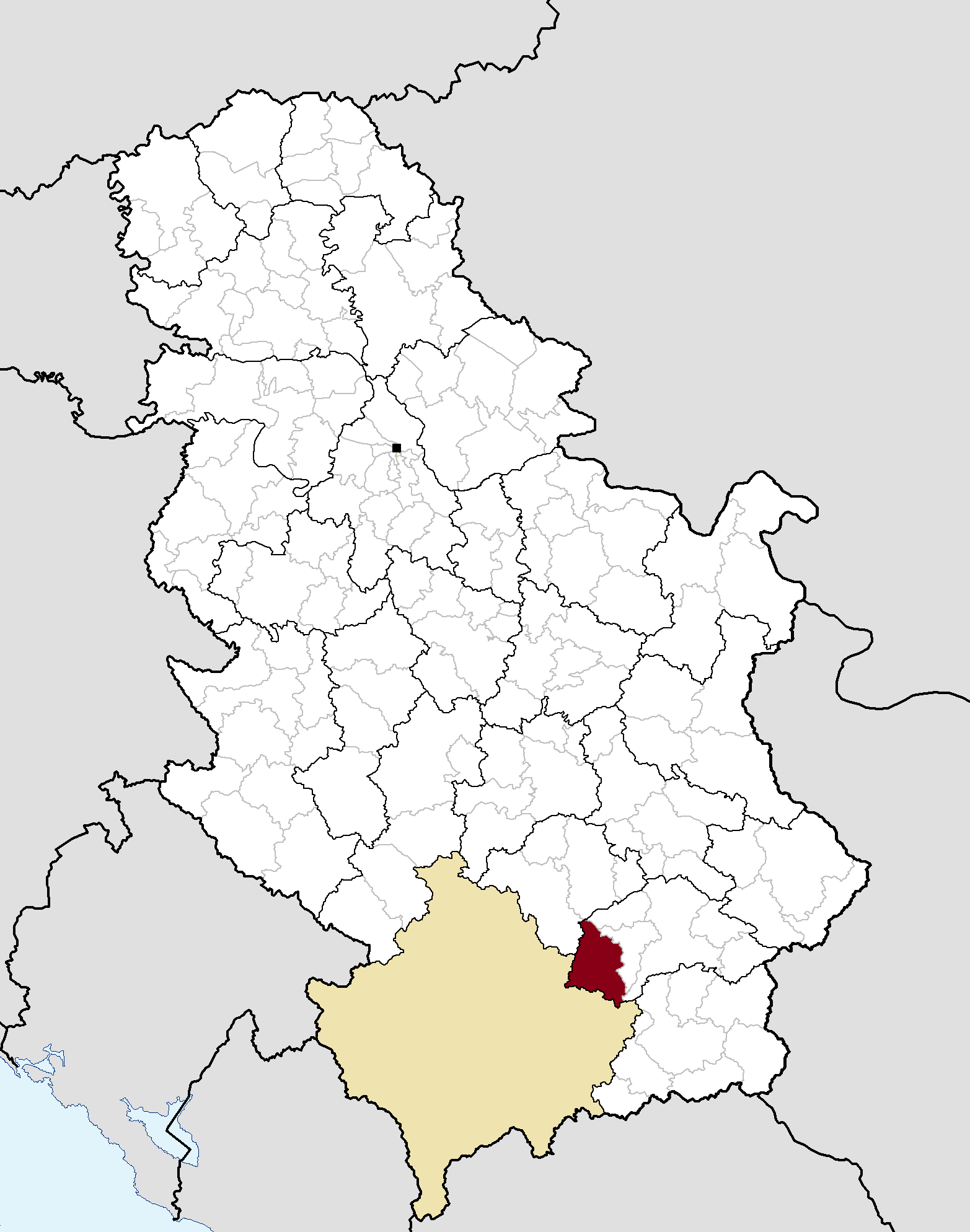
- Location of the municipality of Medveđa within Serbia
- Coordinates: 42°50′35″N 21°35′05″E
- Country: Serbia
- Region: Southern and Eastern Serbia
- District: Jablanica
- Settlements: 44

Government
  - Mayor: Dragan Kulić (SNS)

Area
  - Town: 19.82 km^{2} (7.65 sq mi)
  - Municipality: 524 km^{2} (202 sq mi)
- Elevation: 440 m (1,440 ft)

Population (2022 census)
  - Town: 2,993
  - Town density: 151.0/km^{2} (391.1/sq mi)
  - Municipality: 6,360
  - Municipality density: 12.1/km^{2} (31.4/sq mi)
- Time zone: UTC+1 (CET)
  - Summer (DST): UTC+2 (CEST)
- Postal code: 16240
- Area code: +381(0)16
- Car plates: LE
- Official languages: Serbian together with Albanian
- Website: www.medvedja.org.rs

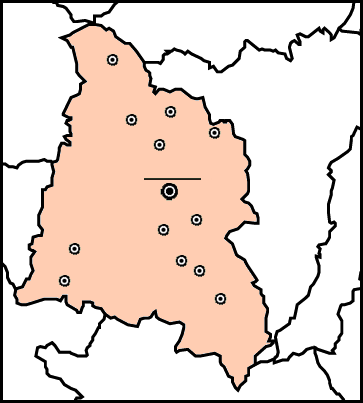

Medveđa (Serbian Cyrillic: Медвеђа, pronounced [ˈmɛdvɛdʑa]; Albanian: Medvegja, pronounced [ˈmedveɟa]) is a town and municipality located in the Jablanica District of southern Serbia. As of the 2022 census, the municipality has a population of 6,360, while the town has a population of 2,993.

== Etymology ==
The name is derived from the Serbian word medved (медвед), "bear", hence meaning "the place of the bears".

== History ==
During the Roman period, there was a town (mansia) with the name Idimum located in the cadastral area of the modern town. Architectural debris dating to the 4th century AD lay at various locations of the town, as it was a transitory zone of Upper Moesia; travel and postal stations are among the finds.

Toponyms such as Arbanaška and Đjake shows an Albanian presence in the Toplica and Southern Morava regions (located north-east of contemporary Kosovo) before the expulsion of Albanians during 1877–1878 period. The rural parts of Jablanica valley and adjoining semi-mountainous interior was inhabited by compact Muslim Albanian population while Serbs in those areas lived near the river mouths and mountain slopes and both peoples inhabited other regions of the South Morava river basin. As the wider Jabllanica region, Medveđa also had an Albanian majority. These Albanians were expelled by Serbian forces in a way that today would be characterized as ethnic cleansing. Due to depopulation and economic considerations some small numbers of Albanians were allowed to stay and return though not to their previous settlements and instead were designated concentrated village clusters in the Toplica, Masurica and Jablanica areas. Of those only in the Jablanica valley centered around the town of Medveđa have small numbers of Albanians and their descendants remained. This was due to a local Ottoman Albanian commander Sahit Pasha from the Jablanica area negotiating on good terms with Prince Milan and thereby guaranteeing their presence.

=== Yugoslavia (1918–92) ===
Already in 1900, a group of prominent residents of the Upper Jablanica region officially applied to the government for Medveđa to be declared a town (varoš). They also asked for the settlement to be renamed to Dubočica. Only after the fourth try by the local population, Medveđa was declared varošica ("small town") by King Alexander I of Yugoslavia on 31 December 1921.

From 1945 until 1992, the municipality of Medveđa was part of SFR Yugoslavia.

=== Breakup of Yugoslavia (1991–99) ===
In 1992, the Albanians in the area organized a referendum in which they voted that Medveđa, Preševo and Bujanovac should join the self-declared assembly of the Republic of Kosova. However, no major events happened until the end of the 1990s.

Following the breakup of Yugoslavia, and nearby Kosovo War which lasted until 1999, between 1999 and 2001, an ethnic Albanian paramilitary separatist organization, the UÇPMB, raised an armed insurgency in the Preševo Valley, in the region mostly inhabited by Albanians, with a goal to occupy these three municipalities from Serbia and join them to the self-proclaimed Republic of Kosova. The insurgency was less present in Medveđa than in other two municipalities, due to a small number of ethnic Albanians and minor importance.

Western countries condemned the attacks and described them as the "extremism" and use of "illegal terrorist actions" by the group. Following the overthrow of Slobodan Milošević, the new Serbian government suppressed the violence by 2001 and defeated the separatists. NATO troops also helped the Serbian government by ensuring that the rebels do not import the conflicts back into Kosovo. Thereafter, the situation has stabilized even though large number of forces exist in this small municipality.

In 2009, Serbia opened a military base Cepotina 5 kilometers south of Bujanovac, to further stabilize the area.

=== Modern ===
Today, Medveđa is located in the Jablanica District of southern Serbia. On 26 November 2017, the President of Albania Ilir Meta made a historical visit to Medveđa, municipality with Albanian ethnic minority.

== Settlements ==
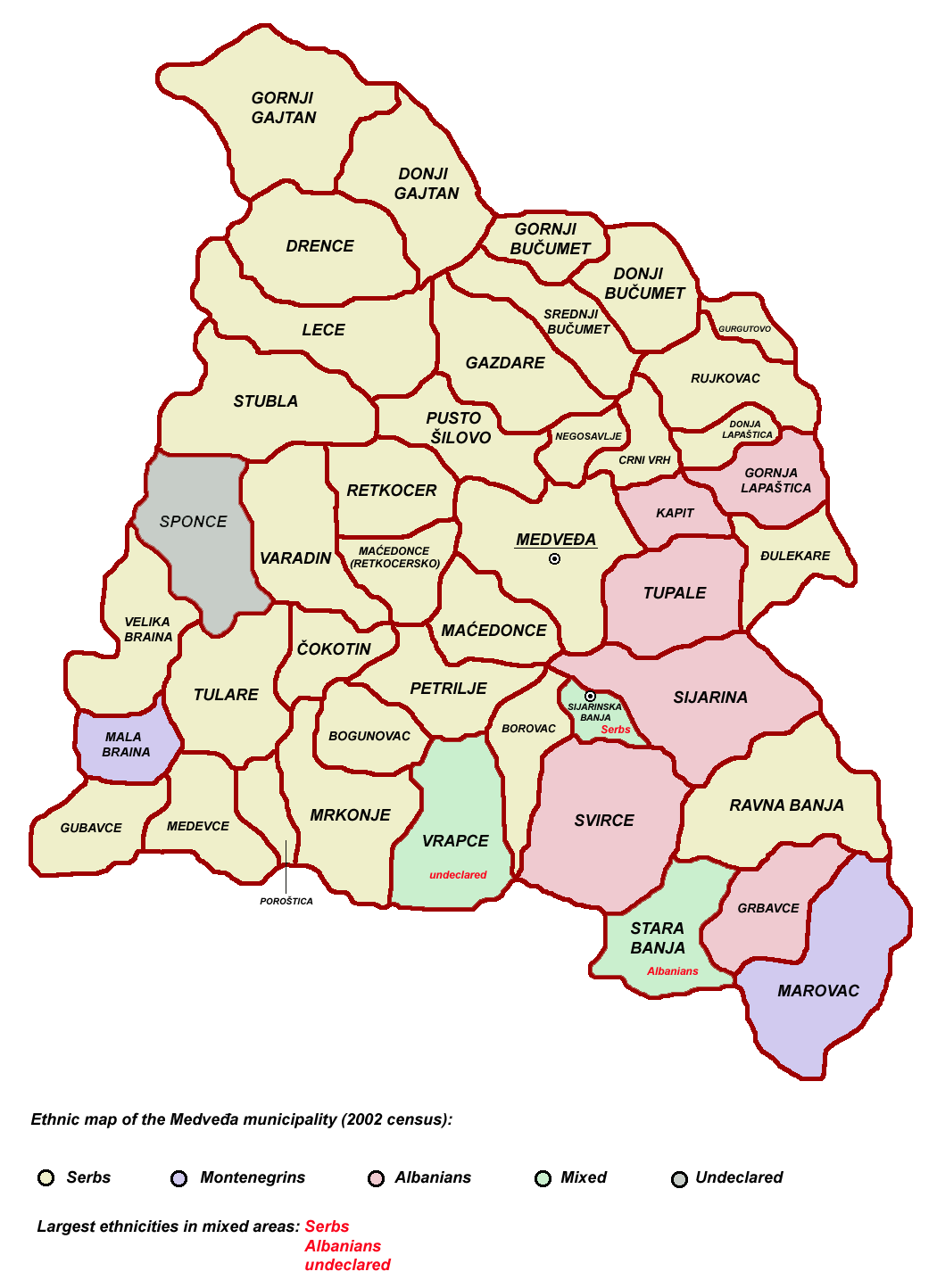
Ethnic map of the Medveđa municipality (as of 2002).

According to the 2011 census results, the municipality of Medveđa has a population of 7,438 inhabitants. It saw a great depopulation in the past 50 years, having nearly 25,000 inhabitants in 1961 and 7,400 fifty years later. Around 43.5% of inhabitants live in urban areas. As of the 2022 census, the municipality has a population of 6,360 inhabitants.

Aside from the town of Medveđa, the municipality includes the following settlements:

- Bogunovac
- Borovac
- Čokotin
- Crni Vrh
- Donji Bučumet
- Donji Gajtan
- Đulekare
- Gazdare
- Gornja Lapaštica
- Gornji Bučumet
- Gornji Gajtan
- Grbavce
- Gubavce
- Gurgutovo
- Kapit
- Lece
- Maćedonce
- Maćedonce (Retkocersko)
- Mala Braina
- Marovac
- Medevce
- Mrkonje
- Negosavlje
- Petrilje
- Poroštica
- Pusto Šilovo
- Ravna Banja
- Retkocer
- Rujkovac
- Sijarina
- Sijarinska Banja
- Sponce
- Srednji Bučumet
- Stara Banja
- Stubla
- Svirce
- Tulare
- Tupale
- Varadin
- Velika Braina
- Vrapce

== Demographics ==
Historical population
Year	Pop.	±% p.a.
1948	22,478	—
1953	24,300	+1.57%
1961	24,244	−0.03%
1971	20,792	−1.52%
1981	17,219	−1.87%
1991	13,368	−2.50%
2002	10,760	−1.95%
2011	7,438	−4.02%
2022	6,360	−1.41%

=== Ethnic groups ===
The majority of the municipality's population are Serbs, numbering more than 75%. Other ethnic groups include Albanians who numbered 32% in 1981 and 26.2% in the 2002 census. In 2011 they numbered only 7.1% as they mostly boycotted the census. The 2022 census showed that 14.2% of the municipality's population are Albanians.

There are other small minorities of Montenegrins, and Roma. The ethnic composition of the municipality:

Ethnic group	Population 1961	Population 1971	Population 1981	Population 1991	Population 2002	Population 2011	Population 2022
Serbs	18,956	13,002	9,654	8,194	7,163	6,429	4,927
Albanians	5,037	5,410	5,509	3,832	2,816	527	905
Montenegrins	110	2,127	1,700	1,011	372	143	80
Romani	36	52	83	119	108	145	149
Macedonians	6	14	17	-	11	13	7
Muslims	61	19	56	16	4	4	3
Bulgarians	-	-	-	-	5	4	2
Yugoslavs	1	68	145	67	2	-	2
Others	37	100	55	129	279	173	285
Total	24,244	20,792	17,219	13,368	10,760	7,438	6,360

== Economy ==
The municipality of Medveđa is one of the least developed municipalities in Serbia. It has many natural advantages for tourism development, as it is in the vicinity of a spa resort with dozens of mineral springs in Sijarinska Banja, Stara Banja and Tulare.

On its territory there are mineral resources for mining, semi-precious stones and marble-onyx. The most promising branch of industry is mining, having mine and flotation "Lece", within the Group Farmakom. It has also solid prospects for development in agriculture and industries such as livestock (sheep, goats, cows) and fruit (plums, pears, apples, quince), also the timber industry and processing.

The following table gives a preview of total number of registered people employed in legal entities per their core activity (as of 2022):

Activity	Total
Agriculture, forestry and fishing	30
Mining and quarrying	420
Manufacturing	59
Electricity, gas, steam and air conditioning supply	10
Water supply; sewerage, waste management and remediation activities	43
Construction	18
Wholesale and retail trade, repair of motor vehicles and motorcycles	157
Transportation and storage	23
Accommodation and food services	38
Information and communication	3
Financial and insurance activities	3
Real estate activities	-
Professional, scientific and technical activities	54
Administrative and support service activities	5
Public administration and defense; compulsory social security	309
Education	212
Human health and social work activities	246
Arts, entertainment and recreation	35
Other service activities	16
Individual agricultural workers	173
Total	1,853

== Politics ==
Seats in the municipality parliament won in the 2012 local elections:

- Group of Citizens "For North Jablanica" (16)
- Party for Democratic Action (6)
- Democratic Party (6)
- United Regions of Serbia (4)
- Serbian Progressive Party (3)

== Gallery ==
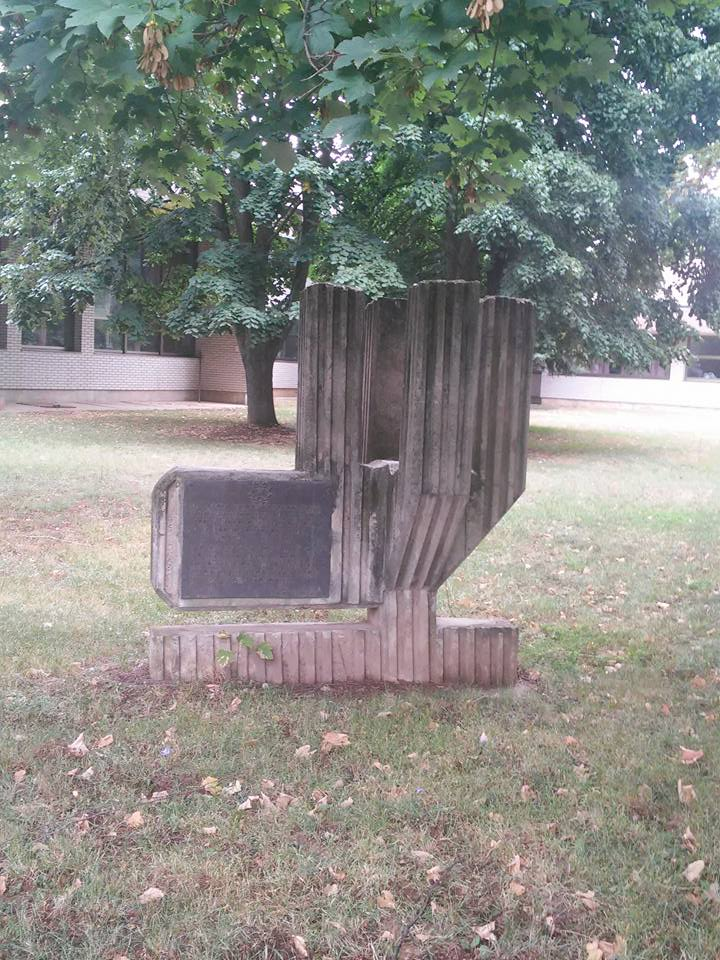
Monument in town center

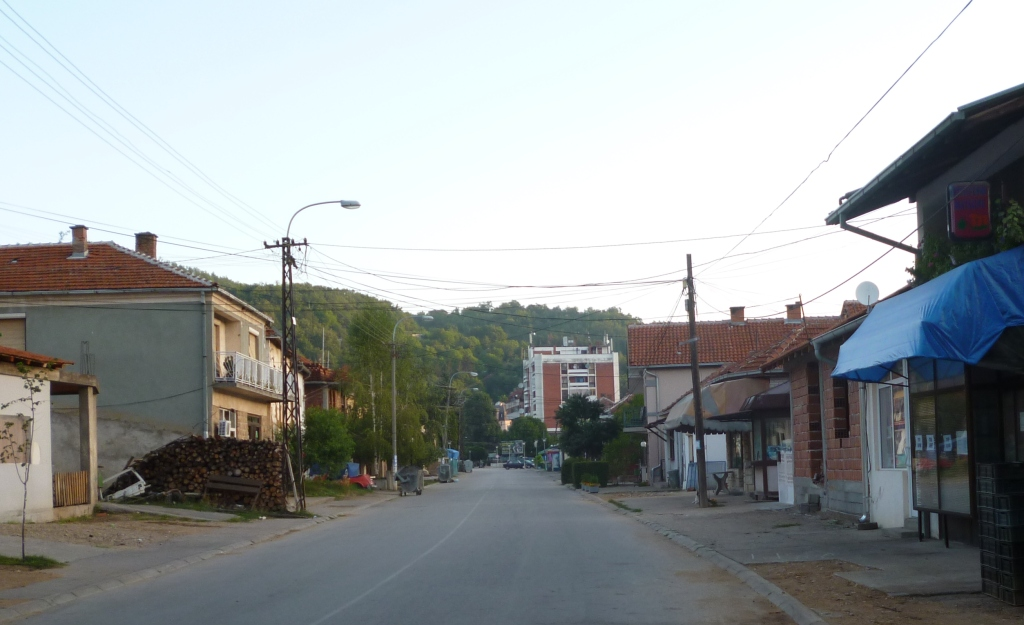
Town streets

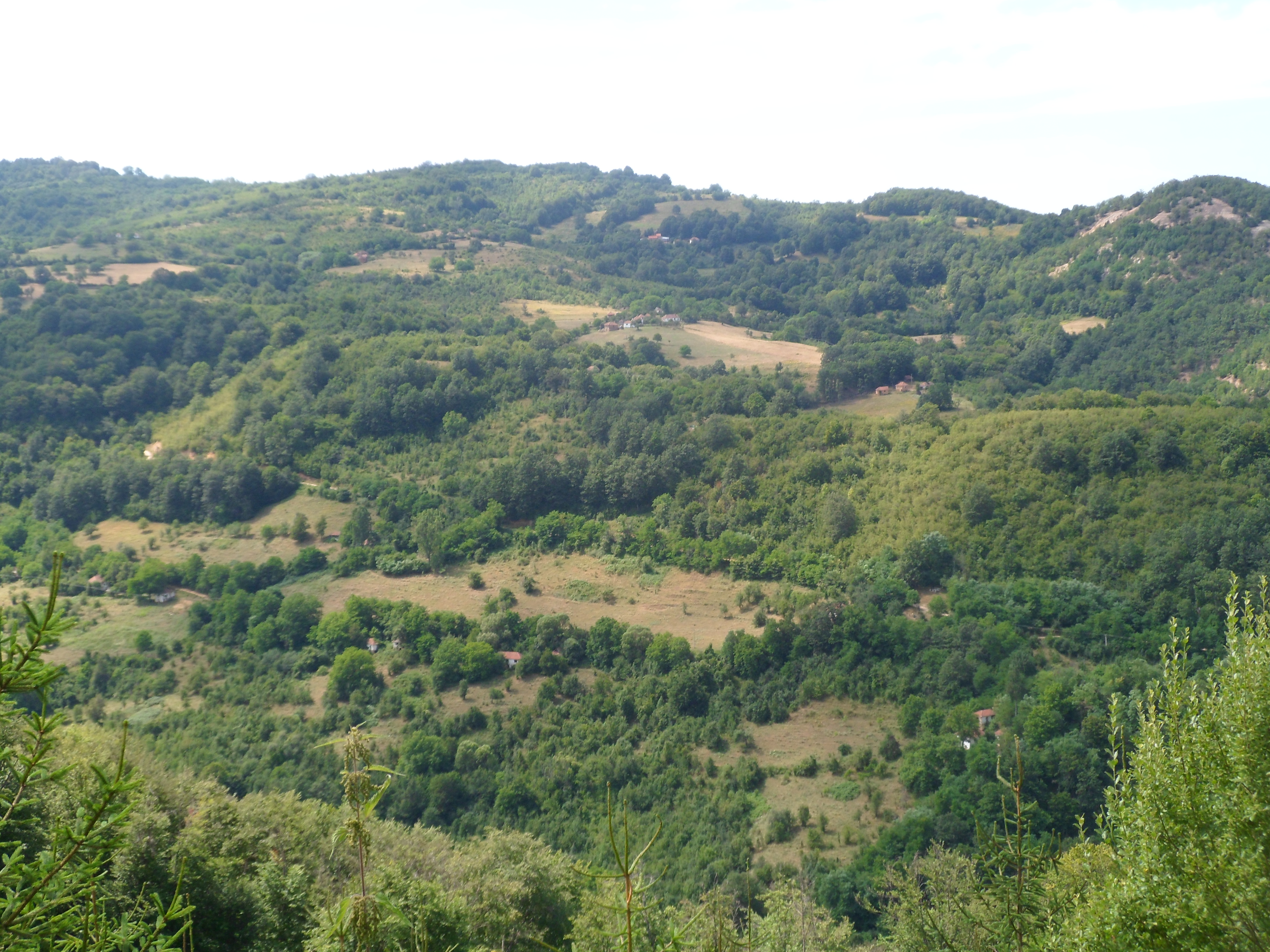
Svirce in 2017

Albanian language school and police station in Svirce

Mosque of Sijarina, built around 1880's

== Notable people ==
- Dušan Spasojević, deceased head of the Zemun clan
- Idriz Ajeti, historian
- Agim Ajdarević, football player
- Veli Dedi Albanian General
