= Stubla (Medveđa) =

Stubla Стубла (Serbian)
- Village
- Location within Serbia
- Coordinates: 42°53′N 21°30′E
- Country: Serbia
- District: Jablanica District
- Municipality: Medveđa

Population (2002)
  - Total: 119
- Time zone: UTC+1 (CET)
  - Summer (DST): UTC+2 (CEST)

Stubla is a village in the municipality of Medveđa, Serbia. According to the 2002 census, the village has a population of 119 people.
