= Grigorije the Serb =

Serbian archbishop (1780–1842)

- Archdiocese: Eparchy of Niš
- Installed: c. 1827
- Term ended: 1842
- Predecessor: Josif
- Successor: Nikifor

Personal details
- Born: c. 1780 Kožin, Trn, Ottoman Empire
- Died: October 18, 1842 Niš, Principality of Serbia
- Denomination: Eastern Orthodoxy

Grigorije the Serb (c. 1780, in Kožin, Trn, then Ottoman Empire, now North Macedonia – October 18, 1842, in Niš, Principality of Serbia) was the archbishop and metropolitan of Niš and the first Serbian hierarch in Niš after the abolition of the Patriarchate of Peć in 1766.

== Biography ==
Grigorije was born into a Serbian family in the village of Kožin in the district of Trn. The first information about his presence in Niš was recorded in the first half of the 19th century, where he was already there in 1819 as a cleric. It is assumed that he was a deacon of Metropolitan Meletije of Niš, because he was one of the collaborators in the school he founded in 1819. It is not known exactly when he became the Metropolitan of Niš, but it is assumed that it was before 1833; while Jovan Hadži Vasiljević mentions him as Archbishop of Niš already in 1827.

He was known for his educational activities. In the school of Metropolitan Meletija, the teachers, in addition to deacon Grigorije, were Fathers Cvetko, Vasko, Petar and Mita. Pupils were taught literacy from the liturgical books of the Časoslov and Psalter, and the classes were in the Slavic or Slavonic-Serbian language. As metropolitan, Grigorije was the head of all church-school municipalities in the Niš metropolitan area. He appointed teachers, supervised them and determined from which books to study. He was a great fan of Serbian literature, and particularly Dositej Obradović.

During his reign, a large number of churches and monasteries were renovated or rebuilt. Thus, in 1839, the cathedral church of the Niš Metropolis was expanded and dedicated to the Holy Archangels. The church and Metropolitan Grigorije were visited on 17 February 1840 by Prince Mihailo Obrenović with his mother Princess Ljubica after returning from Constantinople. On 1 September 1837, he consecrated the church of the Gabrovočki monastery, and in 1838 he finished the renovation of the monastery of St. John the Baptist in Gornji Matejevac and built a new monastery church. In the same year, the Church of the Ascension of the Lord in Gornji Matejevac, of the Holy Archangels in Donji Matejevac, of the Assumption of the Blessed Virgin Mary in Grkinja, of the Ascension of the Lord in Veliki Krčimir, of Saint Nicholas of Myra in Kamenica were also built. In June of the same year, the church of Odžaklija in Leskovac, dedicated to the Nativity of the Blessed Virgin Mary, was consecrated and rebuilt. Church of the Holy Trinity in Babicki. In 1839, churches were built in Donje Međurovo dedicated to the Blessed Virgin Mary and in Miljkovac, dedicated to the Assumption of the Blessed Virgin Mary, which was consecrated on Vidovdan on June 28.

Metropolitan Grigorije died on 18 October 1842 and was buried behind the small cathedral church of the Holy Archangels in Niš.

== See more ==
- Serbian Orthodox Diocese of Niš
