= Miljkovac =

Miljkovac may refer to:

- Miljkovac, Bosnia and Herzegovina, a village in the municipality of Doboj
- Miljkovac (Gadžin Han), a village in Serbia
- Miljkovac (Knjaževac), a village in Serbia
- Miljkovac (Niš), a village in Serbia

== See also ==
- Milakovac, a village in Kraljevo, Serbia
- Miljakovac, a neighborhood of Belgrade, Serbia
- Milojkovac, a village in Pirot, Serbia
