= Dragutin Matić =

Serbian military scout (1888–1970)

- Драгутин Матић
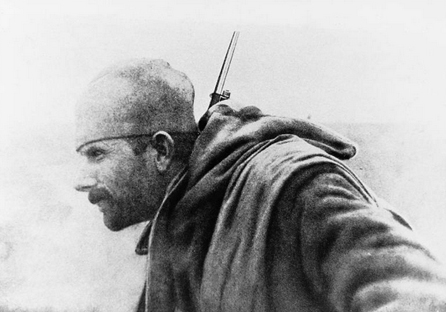
- Matić in 1914
- Born: 10 January 1888; Kaletinac, Kingdom of Serbia
- Died: 1 January 1970 (aged 81); Kaletinac, SR Serbia, SFR Yugoslavia
- Burial place: Kaletinac, Serbia
- Education: None
- Spouse: Kruna Matić (née Ranđelović)
- Children: Blagoje; Ranđel; Kristina; Two more daughters
- Military career
- Allegiance: Kingdom of Serbia
- Branch: Royal Serbian Army
- Service years: 1910–1919
- Rank: Scout
- Nickname: Hawkeye (Oko sokolovo)
- Conflicts: Balkan Wars; The First World War; Battle of Cer; Battle of Kolubara; Great Retreat; Salonica front; Liberation of Serbia, Albania and Montenegro
- Memorials: Monument in the center of Gadžin Han; Memorial plaque at the Veterans' Club Building in Belgrade; Birth house in Kaletinac (reconstructed);

Dragutin Matić (Serbian Cyrillic: Драгутин Матић; 10 January 1888 – 1 January 1970), known as Hawkeye (Serbian: Око соколово, romanized: Oko sokolovo), was a Serbian military scout during the Balkan Wars and World War I. He participated in all the battles of the Serbian army from 1910 through the end of World War I.

A photo of Matić taken in 1914 has become famous and has been featured on media such as postcards and record sleeves, leading Matić to be one of the most noted Serbian soldiers of his era. He died on 1 January 1970 in his native village of Kaletinac, Serbia.

== Early life and youth (1888–1910) ==
Dragutin Matić was born on 10 January 1888 in the village of Kaletinac on the slopes of Suva Planina. His father Peša and his grandfather Mata raised horses and from early age Matić learned the art of horse riding which later proved to be a decisive factor in recruiting into the cavalry.

His mother and father died when he was very young and his oldest brother Đorđe, nicknamed Đora, raised him and several other siblings. Thus, in his native village he was known as Dragutin Đorin (Đora's Dragutin).

Matić never attended any formal education, but he educated himself during his 9-year long military service. and he often worked as a seasonal worker (pečalba) in construction.

He married Kruna Ranđelović from the village of Sopotnica, with whom he had four children by 1910 – first a daughter Kristina, then a son Ranđel and two more daughters.

== Military service and wars (1910–1919) ==
He went to Belgrade in 1910 to serve his military service and was in the barracks somewhere towards Senjak. He was recruited as a cavalryman, and later transferred to the infantry. He often came in contact with Prince Đorđe Karađorđević which he thought of to be silly brave.

When the First Balkan War broke out, he was still serving his military service, and he volunteered to take part in the war. He took part in both Balkan Wars and showed great courage in them.

He also took part in the First World War, in all important battles. In the First World War, he mostly performed Reconnaissance tasks. During the Battle of Cer, he carried his wounded friend Ljubo Milenković a few kilometers from the mountain. Milenković begged him to leave him, but Matić saved him, and Milenković was later treated in the hospital in Niš. Furthermore, he participated at the Kolubara,

His son Blagoje Matić, journalist of Politika, later wrote:

The duty of a scout, he once told us, was entrusted to him as one of the bravest soldiers in the Battle of Cer and Kolubara.

Matić also withdrew through Albania and was transferred on the Salonica front where he took part in its breakthrough and liberation of Serbia. At one point Matić was wounded near the village of Gruništa in southern North Macedonia. He came back to his village in 1919.

== After the war and later life (1919–1970) ==
Dragutin Matić returned home around Christmas 1919. After returning to his home village, he returned to his daily chores. He was engaged in agriculture, and he also went to work, working as a bricklayer and a potter. He went to work in Semberija, Mačva and Šumadija, and he spent his winters in his native Kaletinac.

For a while, he was the guard of the construction site of his relatives Matić in Belgrade. In 1920, his fifth child was born – a son named Blagoje. Between the two World wars, he was also a kmet (village mayor) in his native village. He enjoyed great respect from the people of his region and was elected municipal councilor. With his commitment, a rural water supply system was built in Kaletinec in the 1930s, which is still operational to this day.

When the occupation of Yugoslavia began in World War II, his wife took his military decorations and some other documents, and buried them in the sand by a nearby river. Having witnessed Bulgarian war crimes in the previous war, she feared she could be dangerous to Dragutin and his family.

At the end of December 1969, he fell ill. A military helicopter with a doctor was sent from the military garrison in Niš to Suva Planina to pick him up. However, the doctor concluded that Dragutin Matić would not be able to endure the trip to the hospital. He died two days later, on 1 January 1970. At the time of his death he was 82 and left behind his sons Ranđel, a farmer and Blagoje, journalist at Politika, as well as his daughter Kristina and 23 grandchildren and great-grandchildren.

His son Blagoje Matić later wrote that he was a modest man and he started a story about the events of the wars, he interrupted the moment when he was supposed to mention his personality. He was afraid it didn't look like praise. Besides, he thought there was nothing to say. For him it was a battle for the fatherland for him and everything is given to the homeland.

== Legacy ==
=== Hawkeye ===
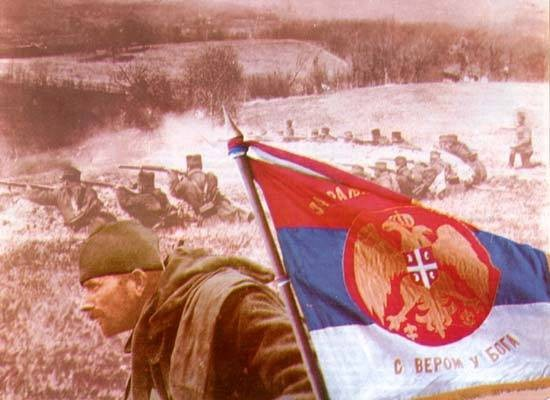
Oko sokolovo (Hawkeye), the postcard that eventually made Matić famous

Matić, not knowing, became famous because of the photograph during the battle of Drina that was taken by Russian photographer and painter Sampson Tchernoff. The photography depicted Matić with mustache and with full military gear during his mission. Soon after the photography was presented at the photo exhibition in New York City in 1916, and was later printed as a postcard when it became world-famous, symbolizing the Serbian struggle in the First World War. The soldier's name was not known and sometimes instead of a name there was an inscription under the photo "Oko sokolovo" or "Serbian soldier – scout on the Drina". The photo exhibition of Samson Černov, which included original photo of Matić was held during the October 2012 in PTT Museum in Belgrade.

Matić appeared on the cover of the 1965 album Marš na Drinu (March on the Drina) by Ljubivoje Vidosavljević and the Carevac Orchestra

It was not until 1965 that Dragutin found out about this photograph. That year, the gramophone record March on the Drina with the famous photography on the front cover. His comrades-in-arms immediately recognized him and Kostadinka Matić from Niš, who knew Matić, bought the record and sent it by mail to Kaletinac, to his address. That is when Dragutin recognized the photography and remembered that there was a photographer that he thought died.

=== Monuments and birth house ===
In 1998, on the occasion of the eightieth anniversary of the breakthrough at the Salonica front, a monument to Matić was erected in front of the Gadžin Han municipal building. It was consecrated by the then bishop of Niš and future patriarch Irinej. The same year, Matić's son Blagoje published a book titled Moj otac: Oko Sokolovo (My father, the Hawkeye).

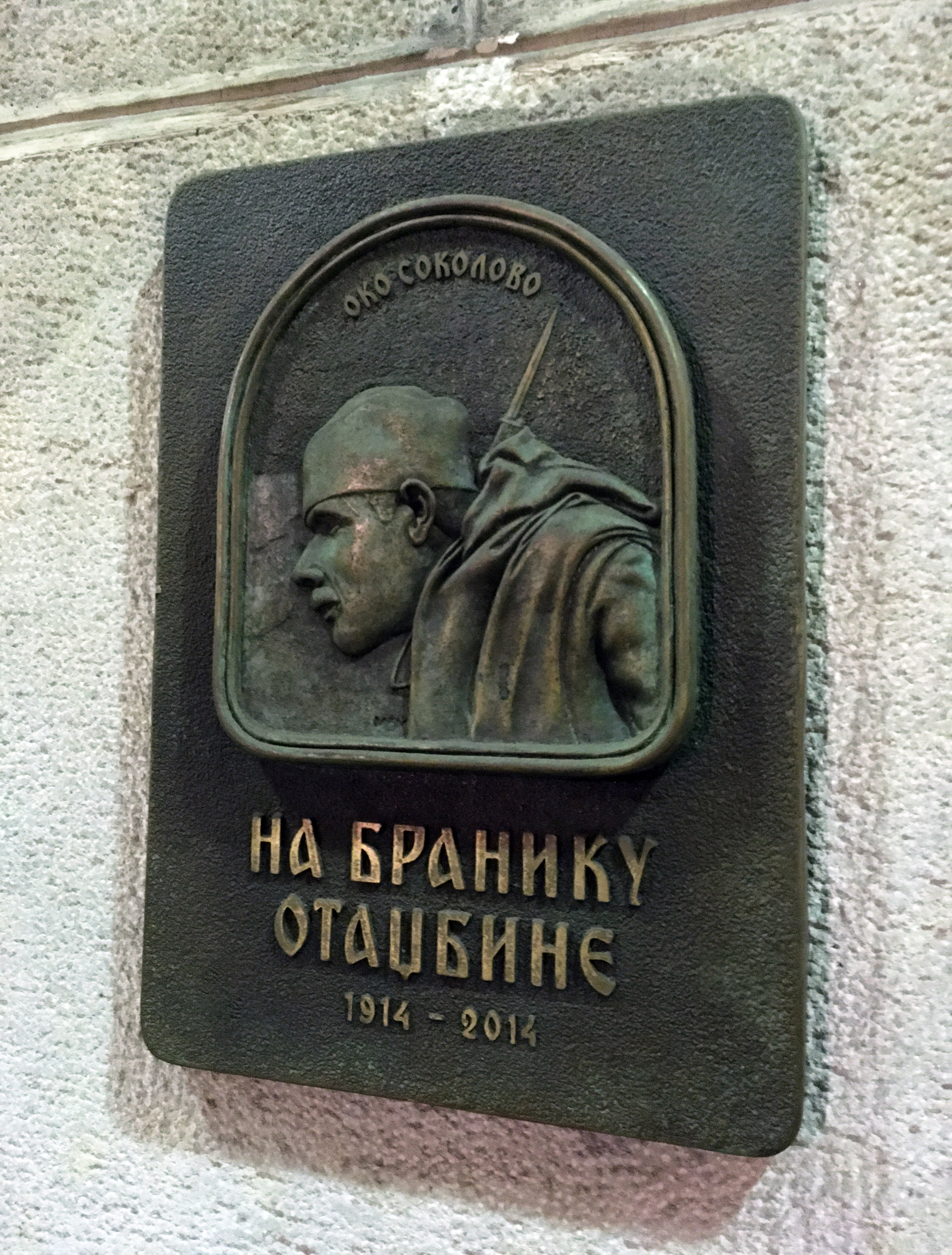
A commemorative plaque displayed at the Veterans' Club Building in Belgrade. The top reads "Hawkeye" and the bottom "In Defense of the Homeland 1914–2014"

A memorial plaque with the famous image has been on display on the Veterans' Club Building in Belgrade since February 2015, where it was unveiled by then Serbian President Tomislav Nikolić for Statehood Day with the presence of general Ljubiša Diković, Chief of the Serbian General Staff, and Bratislav Gašić, Minister of Defence. The artist of the plaque was Mirko Mrkić Ostroški.

In the 2010s, there were plans to reconstruct the house in which Matić was born, his headstone, as well as the road leading to his native village of Kaletinac for an estimated four million dinars. The reconstruction was finished in June 2022 and the house is now open to tourists.

== Medals ==
- Order of Karađorđe's Star, Kingdom of Serbia (x2)
- Order of the White Eagle, Kingdom of Serbia (x3)
