= Ćelije =

Ćelije may refer to:

- Ćelije Monastery, located near Valjevo, Serbia
- Ćelije, Croatia, a village near Trpinja, Croatia
- Ćelije (Gadžin Han), a village in Serbia
- Ćelije (Kruševac), a village in Serbia
- Ćelije (Lajkovac), a village in Serbia
- Lake Ćelije, an artificial lake on the Rasina river in Serbia
