= Duga Poljana =

Duga Poljana may refer to:

- Duga Poljana (Gadžin Han), a village in Gadžin Han, Serbia
- Duga Poljana (Sjenica), a village in Sjenica, Serbia
