= State Road 29 (Serbia) =

Road in Serbia

State Road 29
- Serbian: Državni put IB reda 29; Serbian Cyrillic: Државни пут IБ реда 29

Route information
- Part of E763 Kolovrat-Nova Varoš
- Maintained by JP "Putevi Srbije"
- Length: 142.352 km (88.453 mi)

Major junctions
- From: Montenegro-Serbia border at Jabuka M-6
- 23 in Mijoska; 23 in Nova Varoš; 200 in Aljinovići; 21 in Sjenica; 197 near Duga Poljana; 197 in Duga Poljana; 203 in Dojeviće; 199 near Novi Pazar
- To: Novi Pazar 22

Location
- Country: Serbia
- Districts: Zlatibor, Raška

Highway system
- Roads in Serbia; Motorways
← 28	→ 30

State Road 29 is an IB-class road in western Serbia, connecting Montenegro at Jabuka with Novi Pazar. It is located in Šumadija and Western Serbia.

Before the new road categorization regulation given in 2013, the route wore the following names: M 8, M 21 and P 231 (before 2012) / 26, A6 and 153 (after 2012).

The existing route is a main road with two traffic lanes. By the valid Space Plan of Republic of Serbia the road is not planned for upgrading to motorway, and is expected to be conditioned in its current state.

Section from Kolovrat to Nova Varoš is a part of European route E763.

== Sections ==
Section number	Length	Distance	Section name
02901	18.092 km (11.242 mi)	18.092 km (11.242 mi)	Montenegro-Serbia border (Jabuka) - Kolovrat
02330	5.134 km (3.190 mi)	23.226 km (14.432 mi)	Kolovrat - Prijepolje (overlap with)
02329	9.788 km (6.082 mi)	33.014 km (20.514 mi)	Prijepolje - Bistrica (overlap with)
02328	15.274 km (9.491 mi)	48.288 km (30.005 mi)	Bistrica - Nova Varoš (overlap with)
02902	18.406 km (11.437 mi)	66.694 km (41.442 mi)	Nova Varoš - Aljinovići
02903	17.133 km (10.646 mi)	83.827 km (52.088 mi)	Aljinovići - Sjenica
02904	1.961 km (1.219 mi)	85.788 km (53.306 mi)	Sjenica - Sjenica (Karajukića Bunari)
02905	18.861 km (11.720 mi)	104.649 km (65.026 mi)	Sjenica (Karajukića Bunari) - Sušica
02906	3.284 km (2.041 mi)	107.933 km (67.066 mi)	Sušica - Duga Poljana
02907	27.056 km (16.812 mi)	134.989 km (83.878 mi)	Duga Poljana - Dojeviće
02908	6.121 km (3.803 mi)	141.110 km (87.682 mi)	Dojeviće - Novi Pazar (Odvraćenica)
02909	1.242 km (0.772 mi)	142.352 km (88.453 mi)	Novi Pazar (Odvraćenica) - Novi Pazar

== See also ==
- Roads in Serbia
- European route E763
