= Kaletinac =

- Village
- Location within Serbia
- Coordinates: 43°09′11″N 22°09′35″E
- Country: Serbia
- Municipality: Gadžin Han
- Time zone: UTC+1 (CET)
  - Summer (DST): UTC+2 (CEST)

Kaletinac (Serbian: Калетинац) is a village situated in Gadžin Han municipality in Serbia.

== Memorial House of Dragutin Matić ==
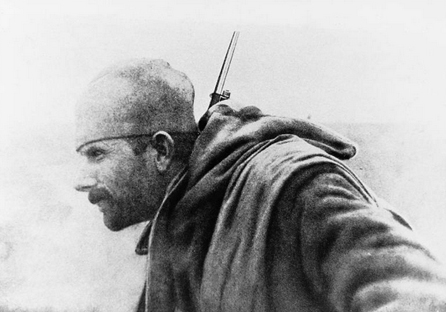
The iconic photo of Dragutin Matić

Kaletinac is the birthplace of Dragutin Matić (1888–1970), a famous Serbian infantry soldier from World War I. His image is widely recognizable in Serbia, particularly from a photograph where he is shown as a lookout of Austro-hungarian positions. That photograph is often found in military albums, encyclopedias and museums. The house was built by his father Peša, and mother Nevena Matić, shortly before his birth in 1888. The house has never changed its appearance since. Nicknamed Hawkeye, Matić was the youngest of seven children, and grew up in the house.

Matić lived in the house with his family until he died in 1970. In the mid-2000s an initiative was started to adapt his birth house in Kaletinac into the museum. The house was abandoned and derelict as all the descendants of the Matić family moved out and some emigrated abroad. In July 2018, it was announced that the house would be reconstructed and turned into the memorial home. The living descendants waived their rights on the house and donated it to the municipality to turn it into the museum. Reconstruction is scheduled to start in the fall of 2018.

The reconstruction was postponed and by 2021, the surveys showed that reconstruction was impossible. The roof had completely collapsed, and few remaining walls were cracked with only the basement remaining intact. The ruins had decayed and become prone to collapse. It was decided to demolish the ruins and to fully rebuild the house in the authentic style of the original structure, typical of the village's 19th-century folk houses. It would have the same appearance and be made of the same materials: stone, wood and earth. Work began in June 2021. The finished house would be adapted into the Heritage Museum, which would also exhibit artifacts found during the demolition. The souvenir shop will be built next to the house. The venue was opened on 24 June 2022, as both the Memorial House of Dragutin Matić, and the Heritage Museum of Zaplanje.

There is a modest memorial at the local cemetery, where Matić was buried. Commemorating the100th anniversary of the war, Milovan Vitezović published a poem "All-seeing eye" about Matić in 2014, while sculptor Mirko Mrkić Ostroški created a bronze relief of Matić, which was placed as a memorial plaque on the façade of the Military Club of Serbia. A monument to Matić was also erected in Gadžin Han, Kaletinac's municipal seat.
