= Mlaka Antinska =

- Village (Selo)
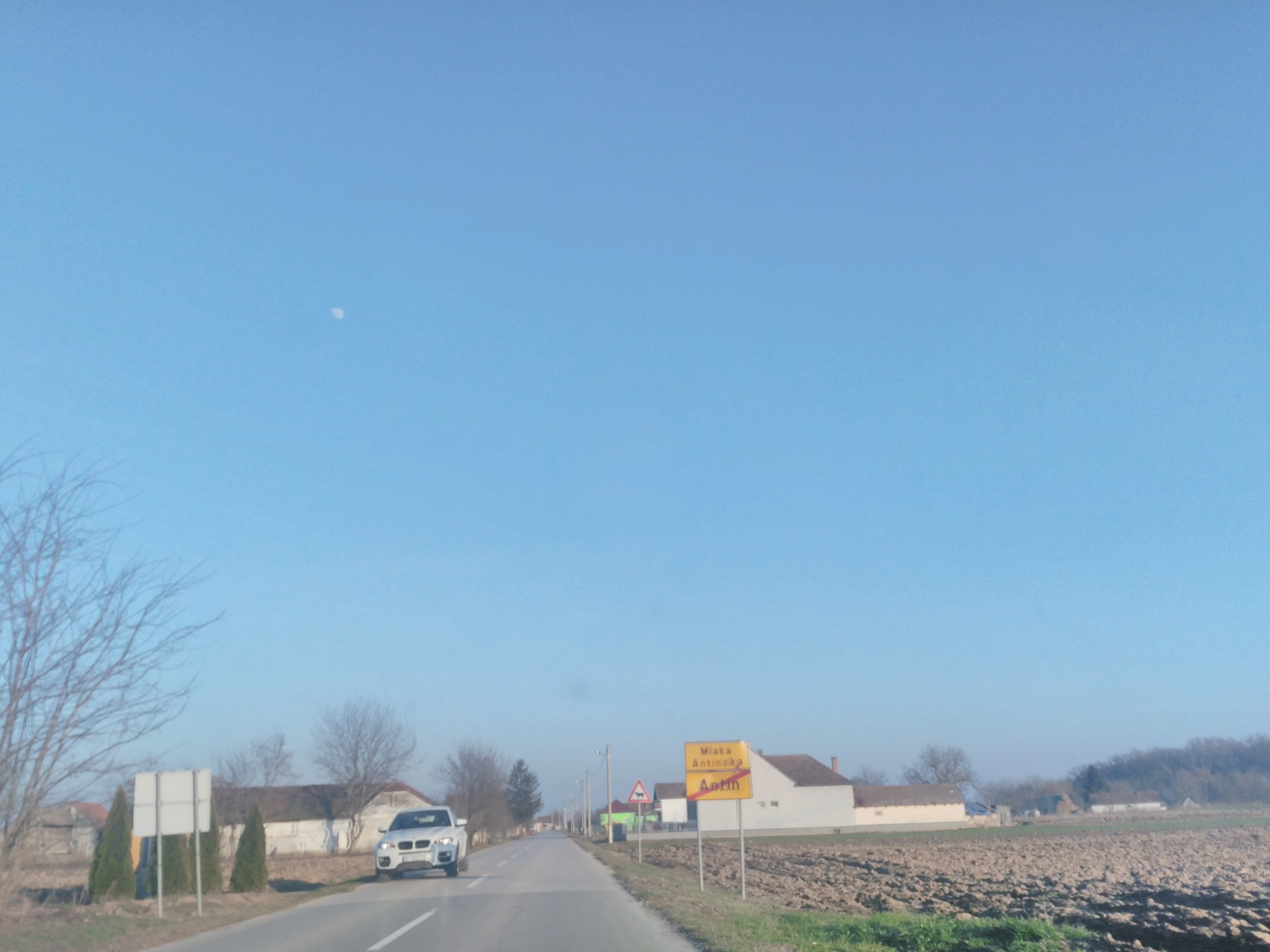

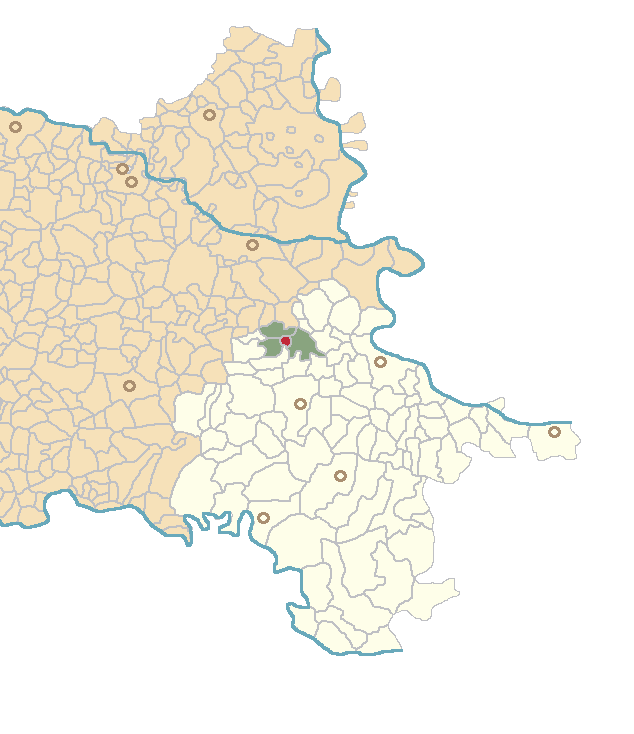
- Location of Mlaka Antinska in Croatia

- Location within Vukovar-Syrmia County Location within Croatia Location within Europe
- Coordinates: 45°22′44″N 18°46′8″E
- Country: Croatia
- Region: Slavonia (Podunavlje)
- County: Vukovar-Syrmia
- Municipality: Tordinci

Government
  - Body: Local Committee

Area
  - Total: 2.6 km^{2} (1.0 sq mi)

Population (2021)
  - Total: 55
  - Density: 21/km^{2} (55/sq mi)
- Demonym(s): Mlačanin (♂) Mlačanka (♀) (per grammatical gender)
- Time zone: UTC+1 (CET)
  - Summer (DST): UTC+2 (CEST)
- Postal code: 32 214 Tordinci
- Vehicle registration: VK

Mlaka Antinska (Serbian Cyrillic: Млака Антинска, Hungarian: Tótfalu) is a small village in the municipality of Tordinci, Vukovar-Syrmia County, Croatia. Village is closely related with neighboring village of Antin. Mlaka Antinska is faced with the challenge of population decline caused by the post-Croatian War of Independence economic situation. Population decline intensified in the aftermath of the 2013 enlargement of the European Union with number of people emigrating to the United Kingdom, Ireland and Germany. Some local inhabitants compared the issue with the depopulation of the Great Plains in the United States. The settlement was originally a pustara, a Pannonian type of hamlet.

== Geography ==
Mlaka Antinska is located on the left northern bank of the Vuka River and the Vuka-Vuka Canal which is dividing the settlement on two parts. Settlement is located on the main road between villages Antin and Tordinci.

== Culture ==
Already in 2013 there was not a single registered cultural organization or activity which was taking place in Mlaka Antinska. While Tordinci Municipality is defining official usage of Hungarian language, ethnic Hungarian flag and proportional representation in municipal institutions for Hungarian community centered in the village of Korođ, Municipal Statute do not contain similar provisions for much smaller Serb community living primarily in Mlaka Antinska. Local Serb community relies on cultural activities and education in their language in neighboring Markušica or to a lesser extent Trpinja and Šodolovci municipalities.

Mlaka Antinska gained some attention in popular culture during the RTL Televizija docu-soap Ljubav je na selu when the youngest farmer participant was from the village.

== Agriculture ==
In 2017 the Croatian Ministry of Agriculture registered a case of Influenza A virus subtype H5N8 resulting in euthanasia of 600 chickens.
