= Gabrovo (disambiguation) =

Gabrovo is a town in Gabrovo Province, Bulgaria.

Gabrovo can also refer to:

== Bulgaria ==
- Gabrovo, Blagoevgrad Province, village in Blagoevgrad Municipality, Blagoevgrad Province, Bulgaria
- Gabrovo, Kardzhali Province, village in Chernoochene Municipality, Kardzhali Province, Bulgaria
- Gabrovo Municipality, in Gabrovo Province, Bulgaria
- Gabrovo Province, Bulgaria

== North Macedonia ==
- Gabrovo, Delčevo, village in the municipality of Delčevo, North Macedonia
- Gabrovo, Gevgelija, village in the municipality of Gevgelija, North Macedonia
- Gabrovo, Strumica, village in the municipality of Strumica, North Macedonia

== Slovenia ==
- Gabrovo, Škofja Loka, village in the Municipality of Škofja Loka, Upper Carniola region, Slovenia

== Southern Ocean ==
- Gabrovo Knoll, peak in the Friesland Ridge, Tangra Mountains, Livingston Island
