= Novo Selo (Gadžin Han) =

- Village
- Location in Serbia
- Coordinates: 43°09′20″N 21°57′25″E
- Country: Serbia
- Region: Southern and Eastern Serbia
- District: Nišava
- Municipality: Gadžin Han
- Time zone: UTC+1 (CET)
  - Summer (DST): UTC+2 (CEST)

Novo Selo is a village situated in Gadžin Han municipality in Serbia. The etymology of the village comes from Slavic languages meaning new village, Novo Selo.
