= Jagličje =

Jagličje Јагличје
- Village
- Location within Serbia
- Country: Serbia
- Region: Southern and Eastern Serbia
- District: Nišava
- Municipality: Gadžin Han

Population (2002)
  - Total: 92
- Time zone: UTC+1 (CET)
  - Summer (DST): UTC+2 (CEST)

Jagličje is a village in Serbia, in the municipality of Gadžin Han in Nišava District. According to the census of 2002, there were 92 people according to the census of 1991, there were 140 inhabitants.

== Demographics ==
There are 91 adult residents in the village of Jagličje, the average age being 67.0 years (68.4 for men and 65.6 for women). The village has 59 households, and the average number of members per household is 1.56. This settlement is populated entirely by Serbs according to the census of 2002.
