= Mali Vrtop =

- Village
- Location within Serbia
- Coordinates: 43.1206°N 22.1636°E
- Country: Serbia
- District: Nišava District
- Municipality: Gadžin Han
- Time zone: UTC+1 (CET)
  - Summer (DST): UTC+2 (CEST)

Mali Vrtop is a village situated in Gadžin Han municipality in Serbia.
