= Gare (Gadžin Han) =

- Village
- Location within Serbia
- Coordinates: 43°09′22″N 22°04′15″E
- Country: Serbia
- Municipality: Gadžin Han
- Time zone: UTC+1 (CET)
  - Summer (DST): UTC+2 (CEST)

Gare is a village situated in Gadžin Han municipality in Serbia.
