= Gornji Barbeš =

Gornji Barbeš Горњи Барбеш
- Village
- Location within Serbia
- Country: Serbia
- Region: Southern and Eastern Serbia
- District: Nišava
- Municipality: Gadžin Han
- Time zone: UTC+1 (CET)
  - Summer (DST): UTC+2 (CEST)

Gornji Barbeš is a village situated in Gadžin Han municipality in Serbia.
