= Donji Barbeš =

- Village
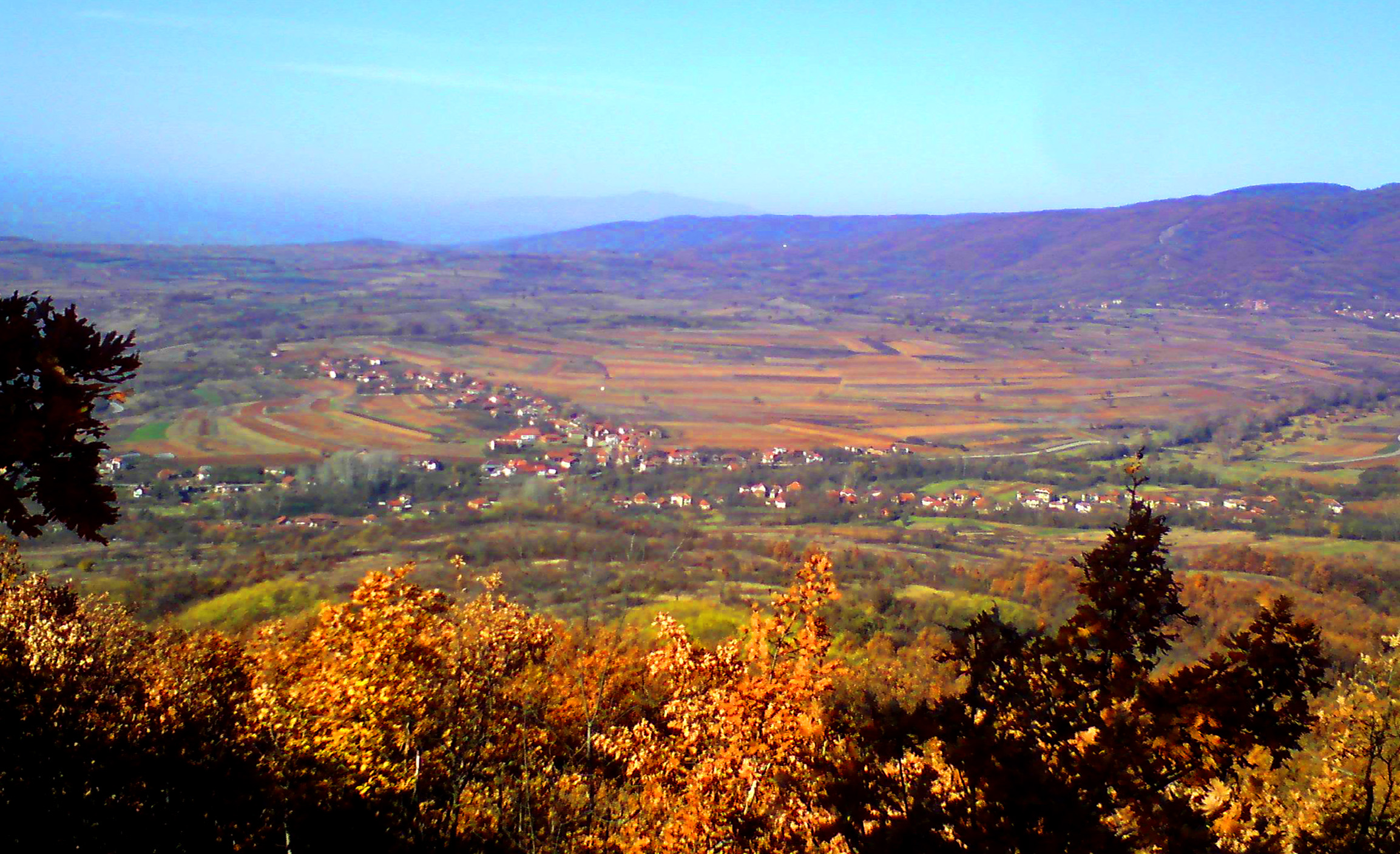
- Panorama of Donji Barbeš

- Location in Serbia
- Coordinates: 43°10′27″N 21°57′46″E
- Country: Serbia
- Municipality: Gadžin Han
- Time zone: UTC+1 (CET)
  - Summer (DST): UTC+2 (CEST)

Donji Barbeš is a village situated in Gadžin Han municipality in Serbia.
