= Tordinci =

- Municipality
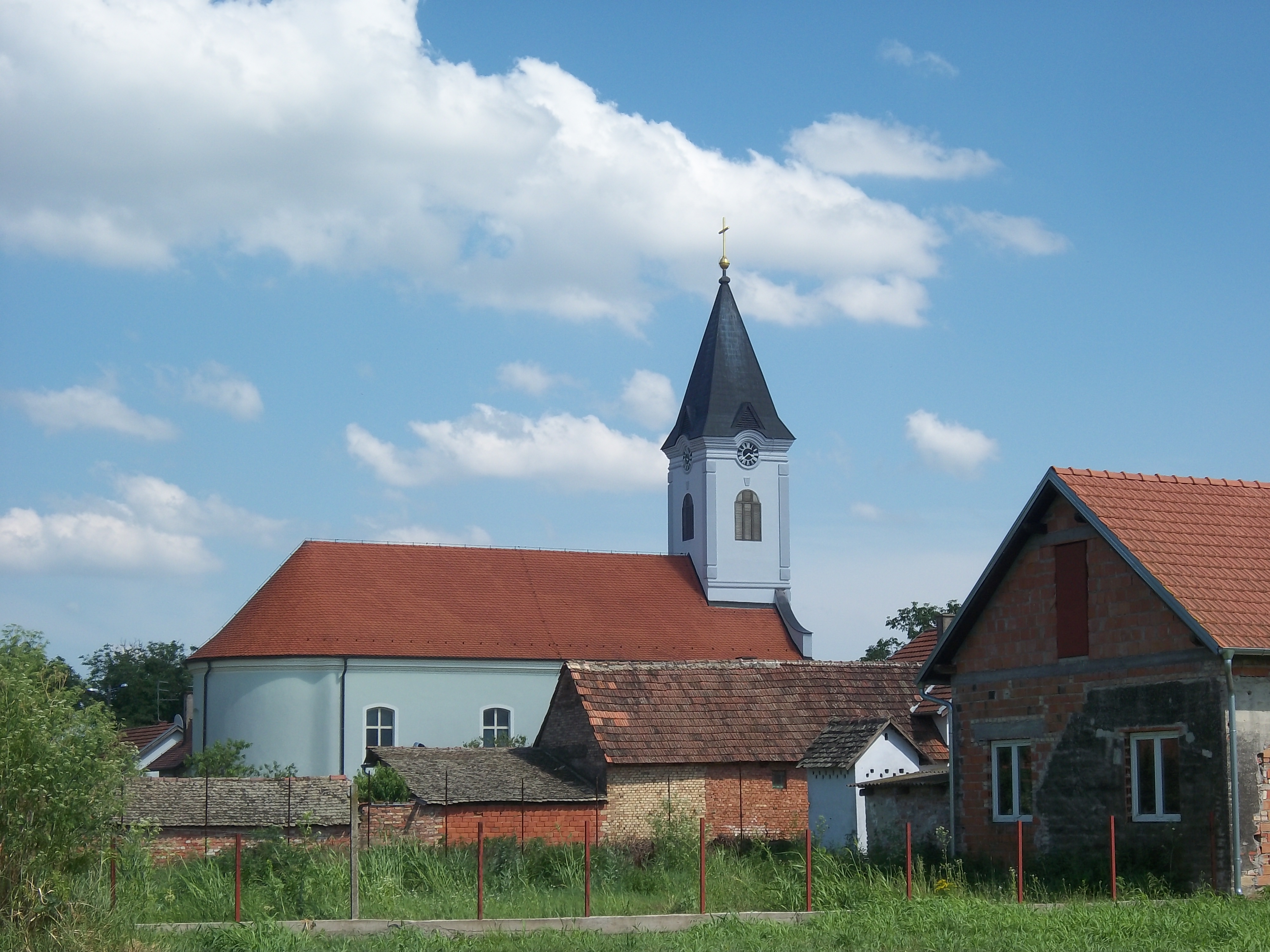

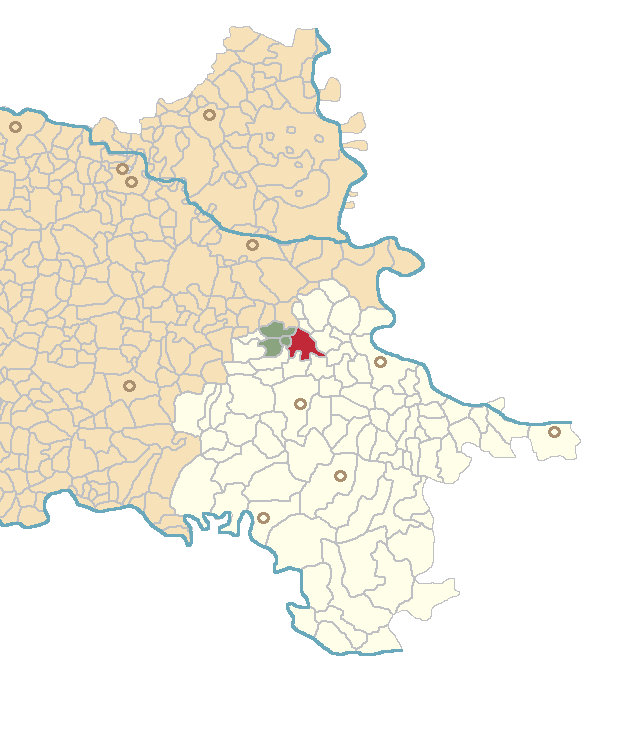

- Location in Croatia Tordinci (Croatia) Tordinci (Europe)
- Coordinates: 45°22′N 18°48′E
- Country: Croatia
- County: Vukovar-Syrmia County
- Municipal seat Largest settlement: Tordinci Antin

Area
  - Municipality: 50.2 km^{2} (19.4 sq mi)
  - Urban: 22.3 km^{2} (8.6 sq mi)

Population (2021)
  - Municipality: 1,657
  - Density: 33.0/km^{2} (85.5/sq mi)
  - Urban: 594
  - Urban density: 26.6/km^{2} (69.0/sq mi)
- Time zone: UTC+1 (CET)
  - Summer (DST): UTC+2 (CEST)
- Postal code: ?
- Area code: 32
- Vehicle registration: VK
- Website: www.tordinci.hr

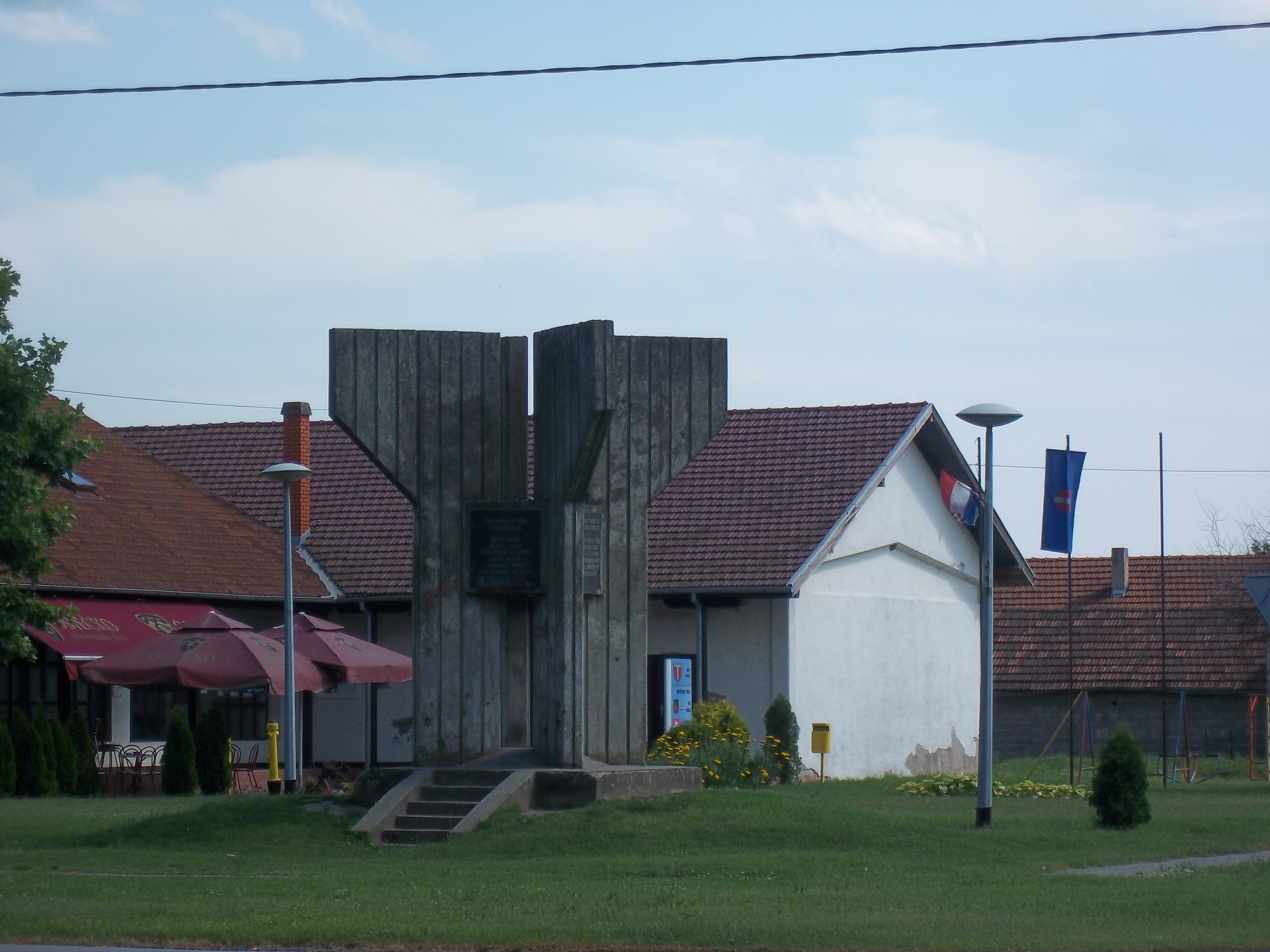
World War II memorial in the center of the village.

Tordinci (Hungarian: Valkótard) is a village and a municipality in the Vukovar-Syrmia County in Croatia.

Tordinci is underdeveloped municipality which is statistically classified as the First Category Area of Special State Concern by the Government of Croatia.

== Name ==
The name of the village in Croatian is plural.

== History ==
Following Ottoman retreat from the region, the Lordship of Vukovar was established, and the village became part of its domain in 1725.

== Demographics ==
According to the 2001 census, there are 2,251 inhabitants, in the following settlements:

- Antin, population 731
- Korođ (Kórógy), population 485
- Mlaka Antinska, population 77
- Tordinci, population 739

By ethnicity, 77.61% are Croats, 18.26% are Hungarians, 3.54% are Serbs. With pronounced issue of population decline in eastern Croatia caused by population ageing, effects of the Croatian War of Independence and emigration after the accession of Croatia to the European Union, the population of the municipality dropped to 1,657 residents at the time of 2021 census.

== Politics ==
=== Minority councils ===
Although though the Government of the Republic of Croatia does not guarantee official Croatian-Hungarian bilinguialism here, the statute of Tordinci itself does. Preserving traditional Hungarian place names and assigning street names to Hungarian historical figures is legally mandated and carried out.

Directly elected minority councils and representatives are tasked with consulting tasks for the local or regional authorities in which they are advocating for minority rights and interests, integration into public life and participation in the management of local affairs. At the 2023 Croatian national minorities councils and representatives elections Hungarians and Serbs of Croatia each fulfilled legal requirements to elect 10 members minority councils of the Tordinci Municipality with Serb community electing only 6 members to its council.

== War ==
During the Croatian War of Independence, Tordinci was attacked for the first time by artillery on 14 August 1991. New artillery attacks occurred for three consecutive days, on 20–22 August, and were repeated on 30 August. A further artillery attack on the village were recorded on 2 September and one more two days later. On 6 September, Tordinci was shelled again and attacked by Croatian Serb Territorial Defense Forces (TO) and the Yugoslav People's Army (JNA) infantry at 20:00. The infantry attack was successfully repulsed by the Croatian National Guard (ZNG). A series of artillery attacks occurred on 15–29 September, while the JNA and the ZNG fought for control of the JNA barracks in nearby Vinkovci. A fresh ground assault on Tordinci was repulsed by the ZNG on 30 September. The next day, civilian population started to flee Tordinci, panicking after the Croatian Serb TO and JNA captured Antin the previous day. On 2 October, defence of Tordinci was reinforced by 97 ZNG troops of the 109th Infantry Brigade, before a new mortar attack on the village the following day. On 25 October, 30 JNA tanks, supported by infantry, surrounded Tordinci at 22:00. The force captured the village the next day after heavy fighting. During the battle, the ZNG sustained eight fatalities and nine troops were injured before the ZNG retreated from Tordinci.

In 2004, a mass grave was discovered in Tordinci, and a total of 208 sets of human remains were recovered in the village by 2012. Since 2002, a 22-kilometre (14 mi) memorial procession is held annually through Tordinci, Antin, Ćelije and Korog - villages where mass graves of 266 Croatian soldiers and civilians were found after the war.

In the war, Serb forces destroyed the bell towers of a Catholic parish in the village of Tordinci by artillery fire. In 2008 the towers were restored.

In 2009, Croatian State Attorney's Office charged Colonel Boro Ivanović with war crimes committed against civilians in the village. The charges include killing of 22 civilians on 25 October 1991, after the a tank company of the Yugoslav People's Army 12th Proletarian Mechanised Brigade, supported by Serb paramilitaries, captured the village. The State Attorney's Office also said that 11 additional civilians were arrested, physically abused and taken to the Begejci camp in Serbia.
