= Odžaklija =

Church in Leskovac, Serbia

Coordinates: 42°59′44.6″N 21°57′3.8″E

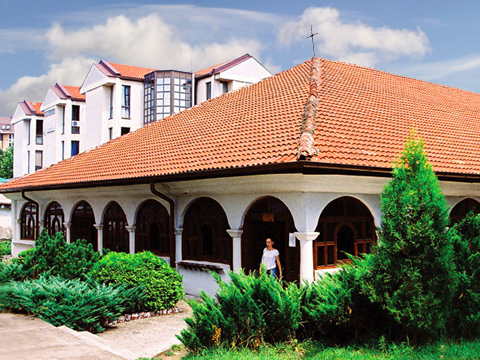
- The church

Religion
- Affiliation: Serbian Orthodoxy
- Leadership: Serbian Orthodox Church

Location
- Location: Leskovac, Serbia
- Interactive map of Odžaklija

Architecture
- Completed: 1805-1812

The Odžaklija church (Serbian: Оџаклија, Chimney church also known as the Old church, Стара црква) is an early 19th-century Serbian Orthodox church located in Leskovac, Serbia.

It was built during the First Serbian Uprising of the Serbian revolution. The Ottoman Empire forbade the locals to build a church, so the people announced the building of a home to the town priest, adding a nonfunctioning chimney to fool the Turkish lords.
