= Ćelije, Croatia =

Ćelije Ćelija
- Village (Selo)
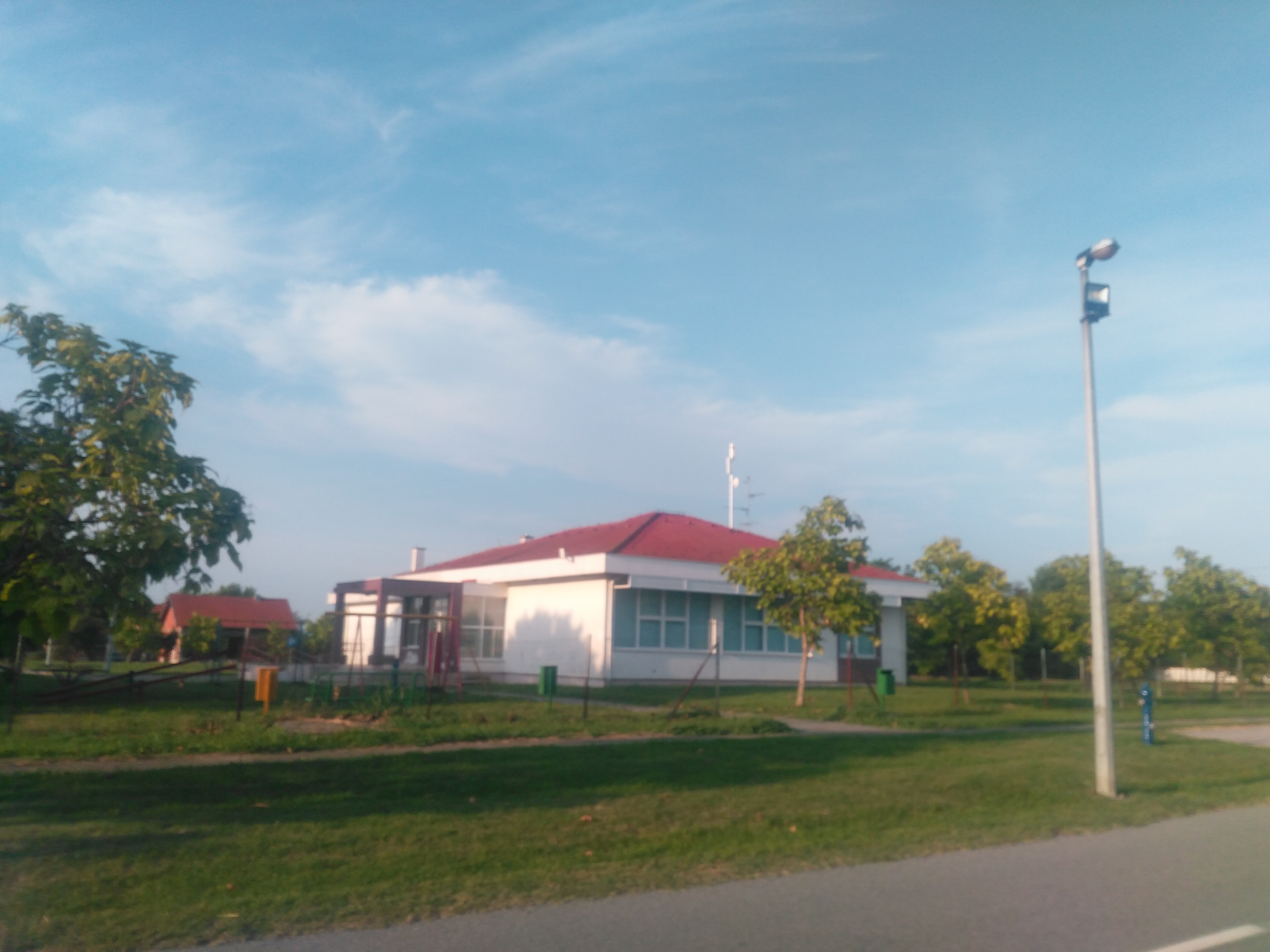
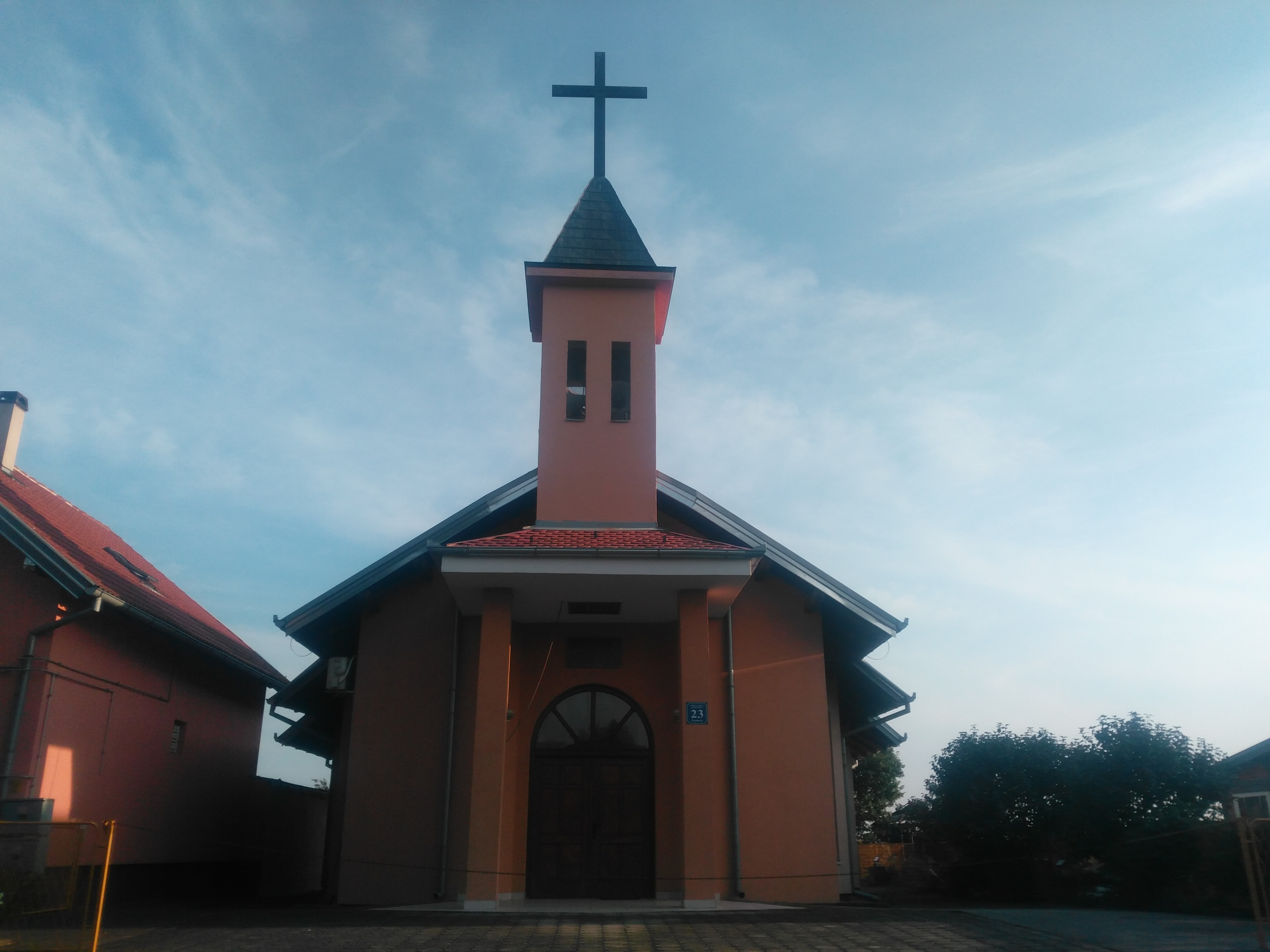
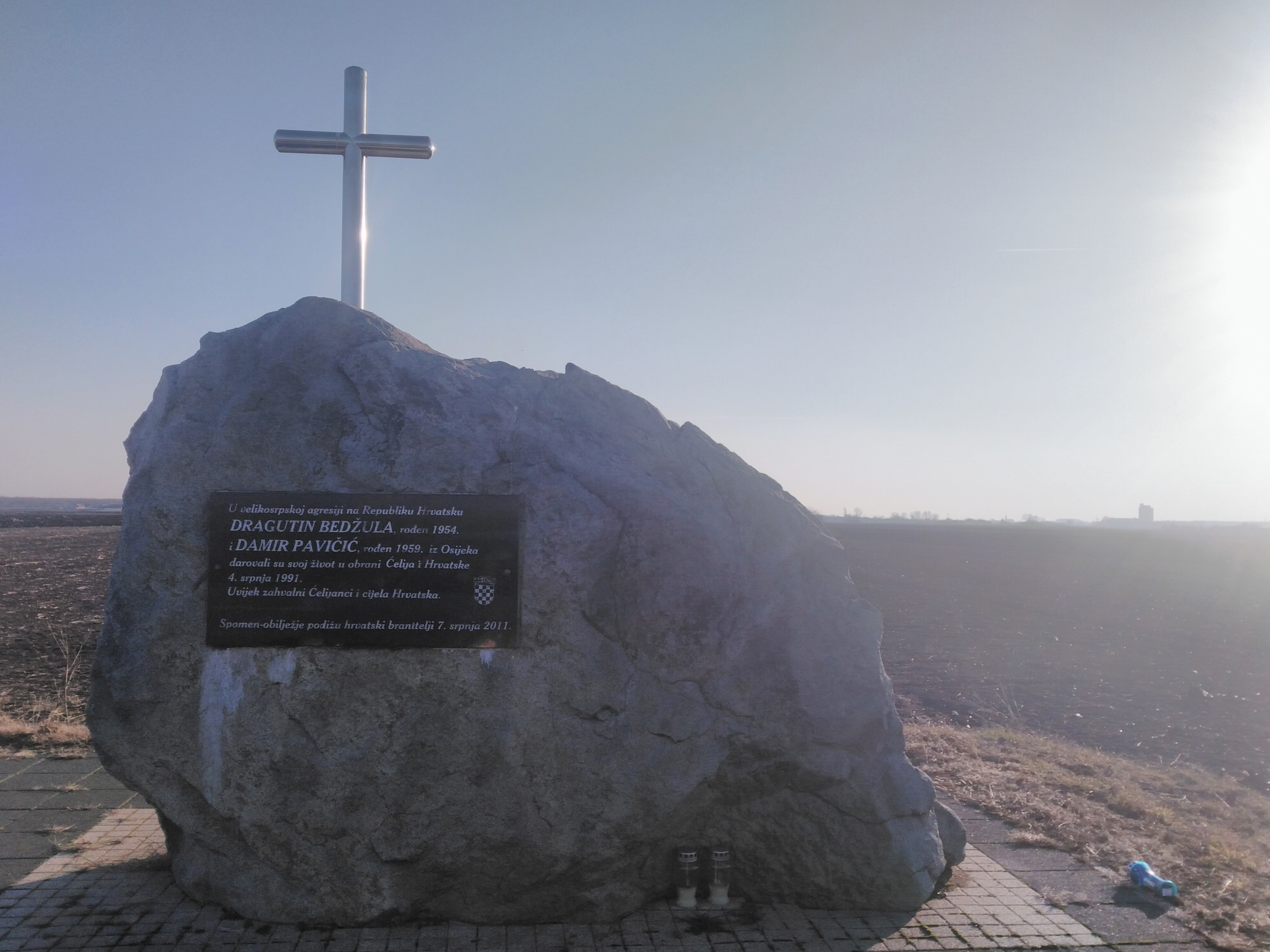
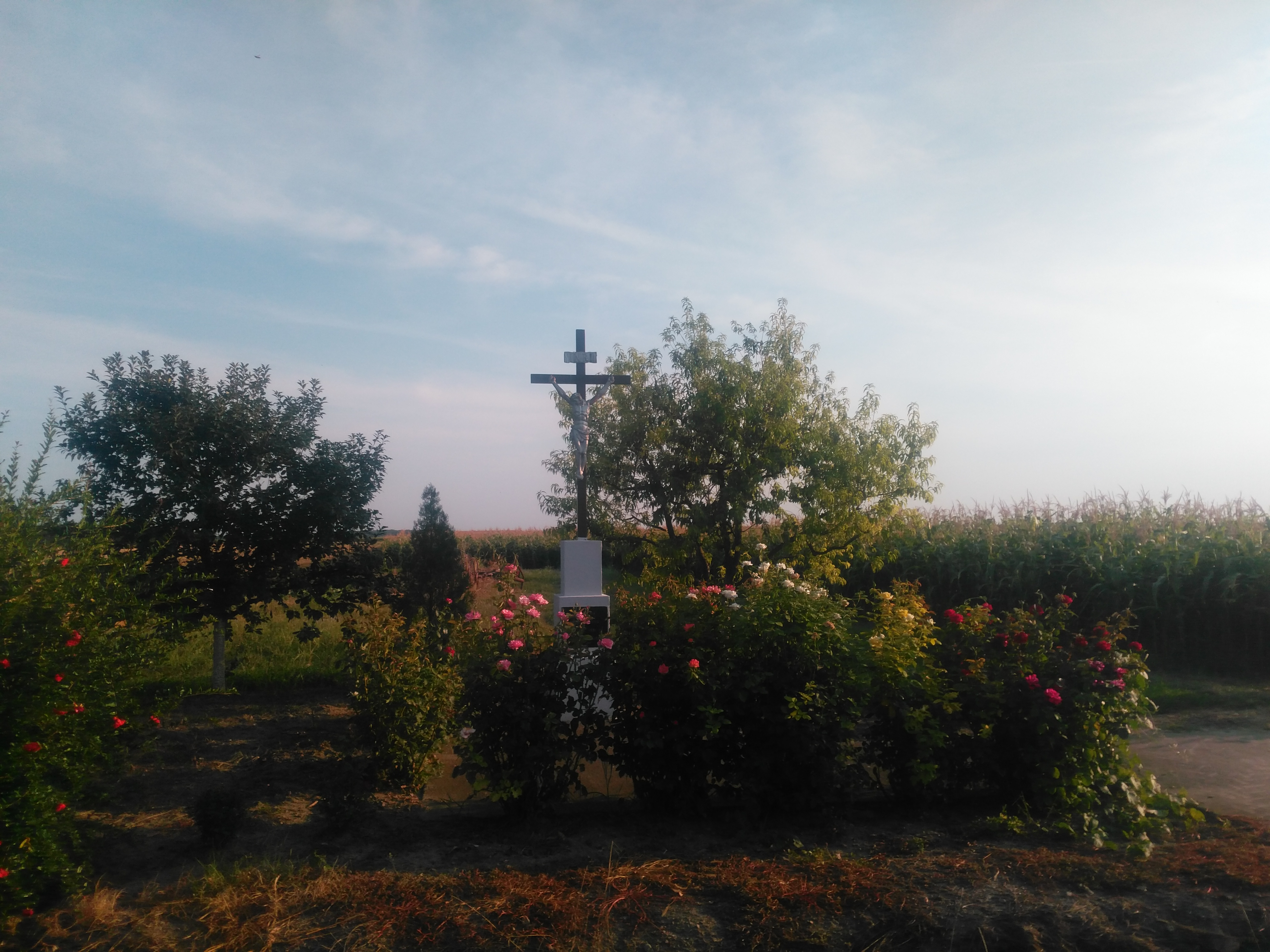

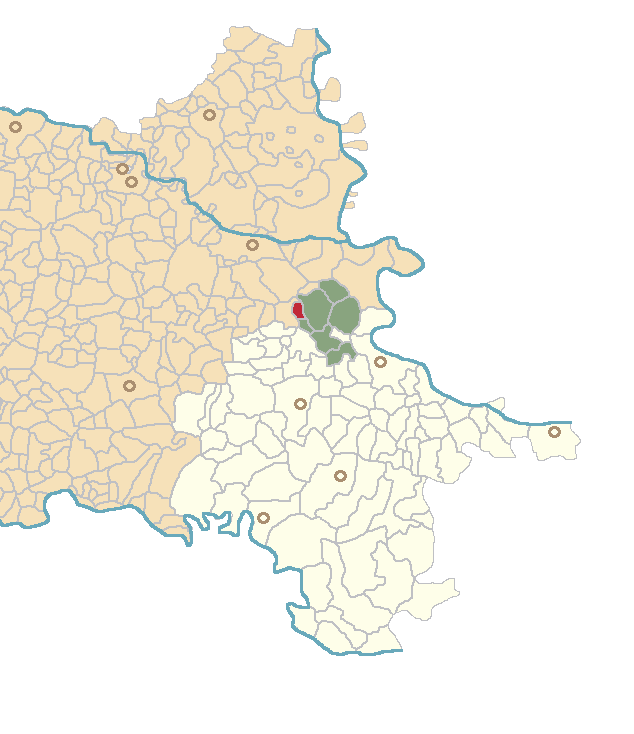

- Location within Vukovar-Syrmia County Location within Croatia Location within Europe
- Coordinates: 45.4386°N 18.8056°E
- Country: Croatia
- Region: Slavonia (Podunavlje)
- County: Vukovar-Syrmia
- Municipality: Trpinja

Government
  - Body: Local Committee

Area
  - Total: 5.1 km^{2} (2.0 sq mi)

Population (2021)
  - Total: 98
  - Density: 19/km^{2} (50/sq mi)
- Demonym(s): Ćeličanin (♂) Ćeličanka (♀) (per grammatical gender)
- Vehicle registration: VU

Ćelije sometimes also referred to as Ćelija, is a village in eastern Croatia located west of Trpinja and south of the Osijek Airport. The population is 121 (census 2011).

== Name ==
The name of the village in Croatian is plural.

== History ==
=== Croatian War of Independence ===
On 7 July 1991, during the initial stages of the Croatian War of Independence, the Yugoslav People's Army (JNA) and SAO Krajina militia forced evacuation of the ethnic-Croat population of the village—180 residents. The evacuation happened in the aftermath of a JNA tank and mortar attack on the Croatian National Guard (ZNG) on 4 July, resulting in death of three ZNG troops. The confrontation was over control over Ćelije. Several days after the evacuation, the village was torched—the first such instance in the war.

Eleven civilians killed in Erdut by SAO Krajina authorities in early November 1991 were buried in a mass grave in Ćelije. As of July 2013, Goran Hadžić, one of Croatian Serb political leaders at the time, is on trial at the International Criminal Tribunal for the former Yugoslavia. Hadžić faced charges related to the killings and other war crimes committed in 1990s but died before a verdict could be reached.

=== UNTAES protectorate and subsequent period ===
Ćelije were left in ruins until 1998, when a part of the refuged population returned, upon return of the area to Croatian control through the Erdut Agreement, at the end of the United Nations Transitional Administration for Eastern Slavonia, Baranja and Western Sirmium mandate. That year, a mass grave containing victims killed after capture of the village was destroyed near the village, and a total of 32 sets of human remains were recovered in the village by 2012. Since 2002, a 22-kilometre (14 mi) memorial procession is held annually through Tordinci, Antin, Ćelije and Korog—villages where mass graves of 266 Croatian soldiers and civilians were found after the war.

In 2011, Croatian authorities opened an investigation against Boro Ivanović, commanding officer of the JNA 12th Proletarian Mechanised Brigade in 1991, in connection with 1991 expulsion of population and destruction of the village.

== See also ==
- Trpinja municipality
- Bobota Canal
