= Grkinja =

Village in Serbia

Grkinja Гркиња
- Village
- Location within Serbia
- Country: Serbia
- Region: Southern and Eastern Serbia
- District: Nišava
- Municipality: Gadžin Han

Population (2002)
  - Total: 771
- Time zone: UTC+1 (CET)
  - Summer (DST): UTC+2 (CEST)

Grkinja is a village in municipality of Gadžin Han in the Nišava District of Serbia, 20 km from Niš. It is surrounded by mountains. According to the census of 2002 there were 771 inhabitants (down from 833 in 1991).

== Demographics ==
In the village of Grkinja there are 670 adults, and the average age of the population is 48.1 years (47.4 for men and 48.8 for women). The village has 299 households, and the average number of members per household is 2.58.
