= Ćelije (Kruševac) =

Ćelije Ћелије
- Village
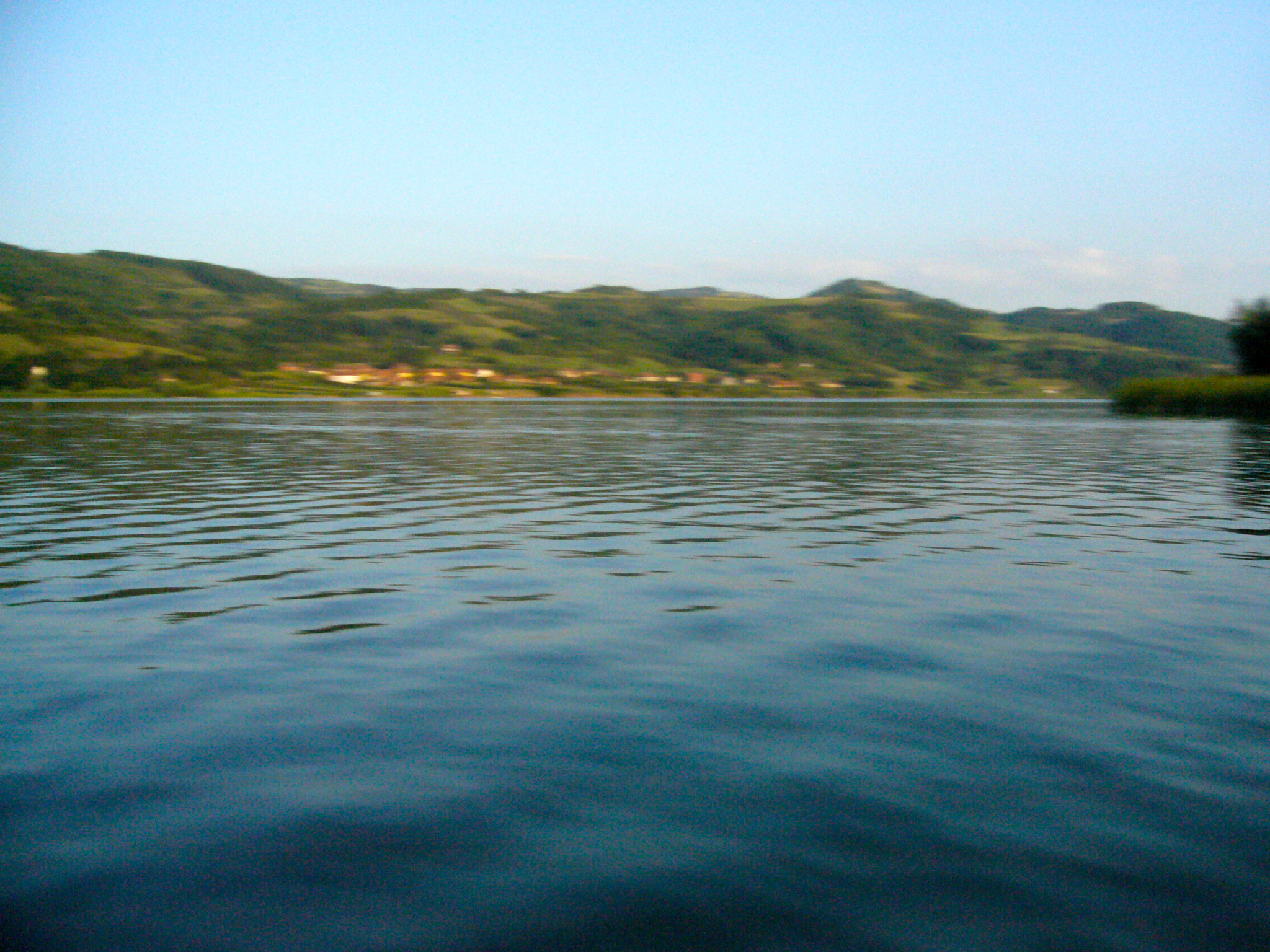

- Location within Serbia
- Coordinates: 43°24′51″N 21°10′35″E
- Country: Serbia
- District: Rasina District
- Municipality: Kruševac

Area
  - Total: 9.89 km^{2} (3.82 sq mi)
- Elevation: 376 m (1,234 ft)

Population (2011)
  - Total: 242
  - Density: 24.5/km^{2} (63.4/sq mi)
- Time zone: UTC+1 (CET)
  - Summer (DST): UTC+2 (CEST)

Ćelije (Serbian Cyrillic: Ћелије) is a village located in the municipality of Kruševac, Serbia. According to the 2011 census, the village has a population of 242 inhabitants.
