= Gadžin Han =

Gadžin Han Гаџин Хан (Serbian)
- Village and municipality
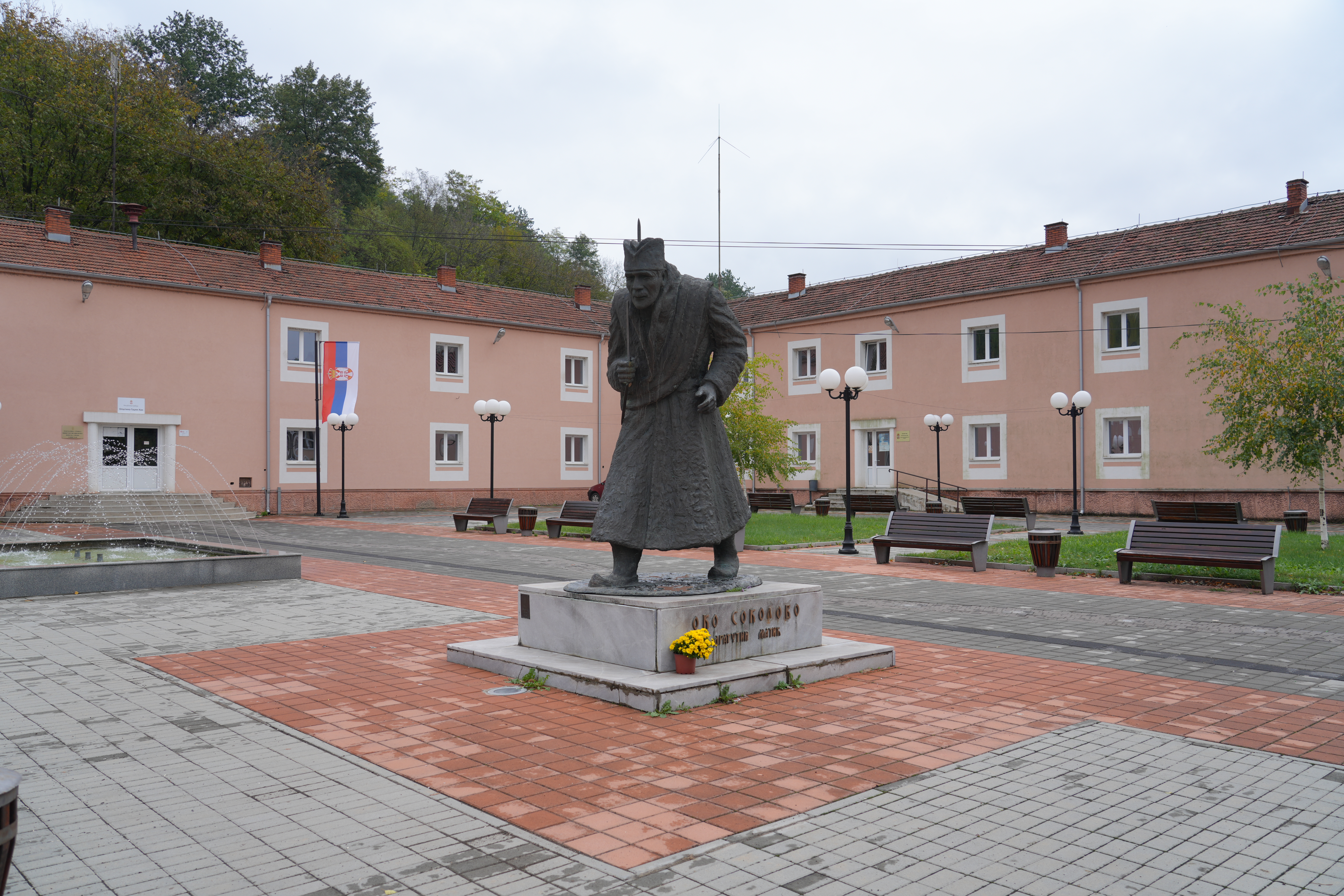

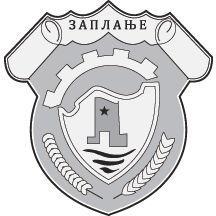
- Coat of arms

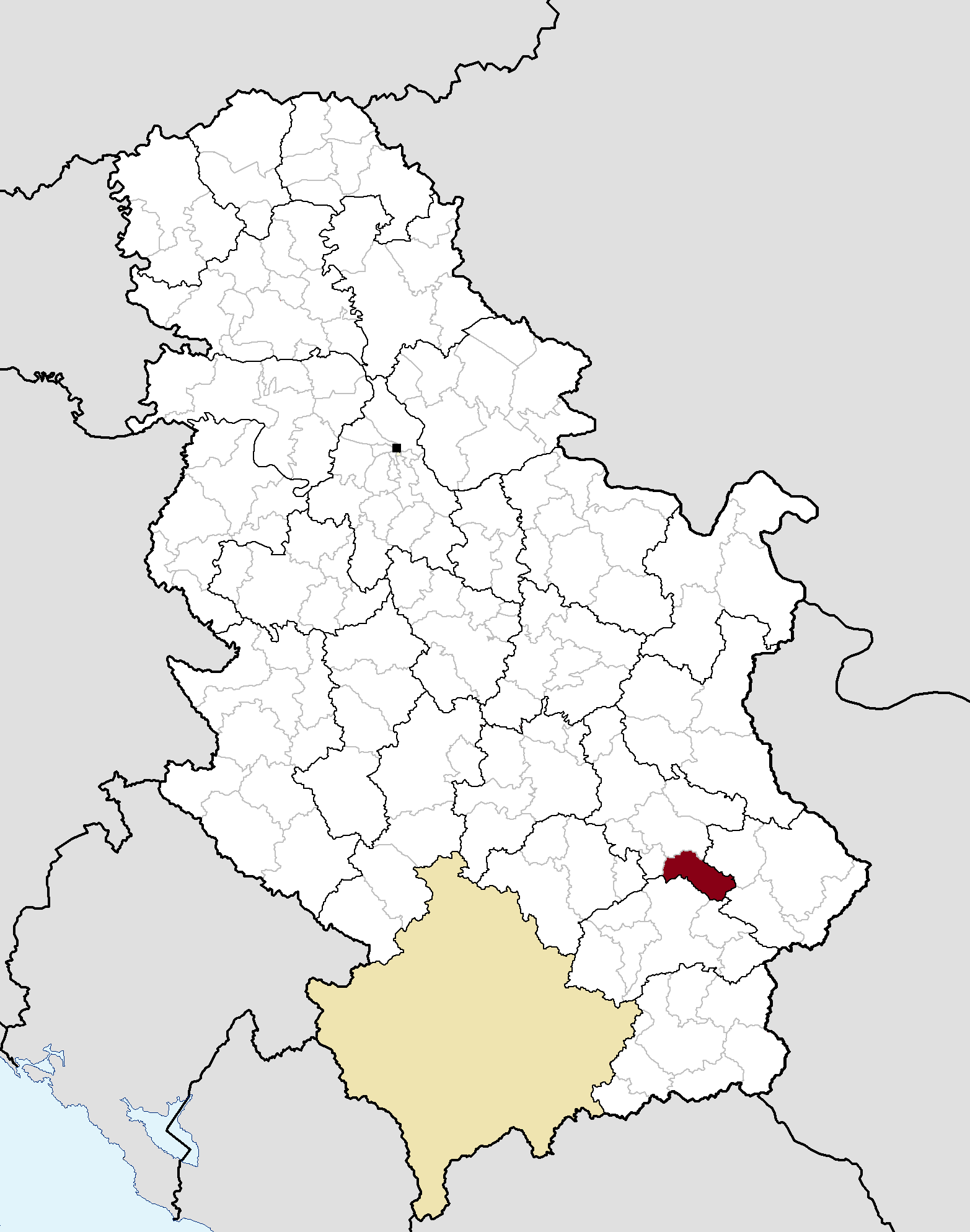
- Location of the municipality of Gadžin Han within Serbia
- Coordinates: 43°13′22″N 22°01′56″E
- Country: Serbia
- Region: Southern and Eastern Serbia
- District: Nišava
- Settlements: 34

Government
  - Mayor: Milisav Filipović (SNS)

Area
  - Village: 7.76 km^{2} (3.00 sq mi)
  - Municipality: 325 km^{2} (125 sq mi)
- Elevation: 266 m (873 ft)

Population (2022 census)
  - Municipality: 5,850
  - Municipality density: 18.0/km^{2} (46.6/sq mi)
- Time zone: UTC+1 (CET)
  - Summer (DST): UTC+2 (CEST)
- Postal code: 18240
- Area code: +381(0)18
- Car plates: NI
- Website: gadzinhan.rs

Gadžin Han (Serbian Cyrillic: Гаџин Хан) is a town and municipality located in the Nišava District of the southern Serbia. According to 2022 census, the municipality has 5,850 inhabitants, from which 1,194 live in Gadžin Han itself.

== Geography ==
The municipality borders Bela Palanka municipality and City of Niš in the north, Babušnica municipality in the south-east, Vlasotince and Leskovac municipalities in the south, and Doljevac municipality in the west.

== Settlements ==
Aside from the town of Gadžin Han, the municipality includes the following settlements:

- Čagrovac
- Ćelije
- Donje Dragovlje
- Donji Barbeš
- Donji Dušnik
- Duga Poljana
- Dukat
- Gare
- Gornje Dragovlje
- Gornje Vlase
- Gornji Barbeš
- Gornji Dušnik
- Grkinja
- Jagličje
- Kaletinac
- Koprivnica (Gadžin Han)
- Krastavče
- Ličje
- Mali Krčimir
- Mali Vrtop
- Marina Kutina
- Miljkovac
- Novo Selo
- Ovsinjinac
- Ravna Dubrava
- Semče
- Sopotnica
- Šebet
- Taskovići
- Toponica
- Veliki Krčimir
- Veliki Vrtop
- Vilandrica

== Demographics ==
Historical population
| Year | Pop. | ±% p.a. |
|---|---|---|
| 1948 | 26,380 | — |
| 1953 | 26,182 | −0.15% |
| 1961 | 23,965 | −1.10% |
| 1971 | 19,974 | −1.81% |
| 1981 | 16,281 | −2.02% |
| 1991 | 12,990 | −2.23% |
| 2002 | 10,464 | −1.95% |
| 2011 | 8,389 | −2.43% |
| 2022 | 5,850 | −3.22% |

According to the last official census done in 2011, the municipality of Gadžin Han has 8,389 inhabitants.

=== Ethnic groups ===
The ethnic composition of the municipality:

| Ethnic group | Population | % |
|---|---|---|
| Serbs | 7,972 | 95.03% |
| Roma | 260 | 3.10% |
| Croats | 4 | 0.05% |
| Macedonians | 3 | 0.04% |
| Montenegrins | 3 | 0.04% |
| Bulgarians | 3 | 0.04% |
| Russians | 3 | 0.04% |
| Others | 141 | 1.68% |
| Total | 5,934 | |

== Economy ==
The following table gives a preview of total number of employed people per their core activity (as of 2017):

| Activity | Total |
|---|---|
| Agriculture, forestry and fishing | 1 |
| Mining | 12 |
| Processing industry | 590 |
| Distribution of power, gas and water | 9 |
| Distribution of water and water waste management | 3 |
| Construction | 110 |
| Wholesale and retail, repair | 159 |
| Traffic, storage and communication | 23 |
| Hotels and restaurants | 14 |
| Media and telecommunications | 21 |
| Finance and insurance | 1 |
| Property stock and charter | - |
| Professional, scientific, innovative and technical activities | 51 |
| Administrative and other services | 2 |
| Administration and social assurance | 104 |
| Education | 110 |
| Healthcare and social work | 84 |
| Art, leisure and recreation | 16 |
| Other services | 78 |
| Total | 1,388 |

== See also ==
- Nišava District
- Subdivisions of Serbia
