= Trn, North Macedonia =

Trn Трн
- Village
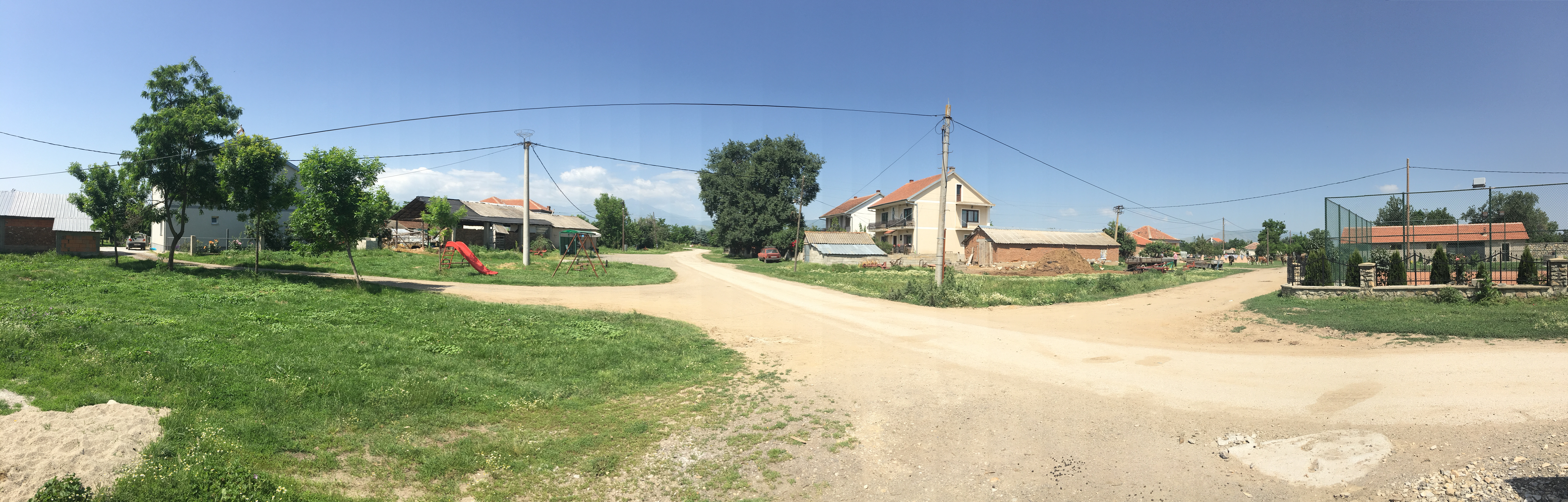
- View of the village

- Location within North Macedonia
- Country: North Macedonia
- Region: Pelagonia
- Municipality: Bitola

Population (2002)
  - Total: 113
- Time zone: UTC+1 (CET)
  - Summer (DST): UTC+2 (CEST)

Trn (Macedonian: Трн) is a village 8 kilometers away from Bitola, a city in North Macedonia.

== Demographics ==
Trn is attested in the Ottoman defter of 1467/68 as a village in the vilayet of Manastir. The inhabitants attested largely bore typical Slavic anthroponyms along with one instance of Albanian ones, such as Stajko son of Gerg.

According to the 2002 census, the village had a total of 113 inhabitants. Ethnic groups in the village include:

- Macedonians 113
