= Aljinovići =

- Village
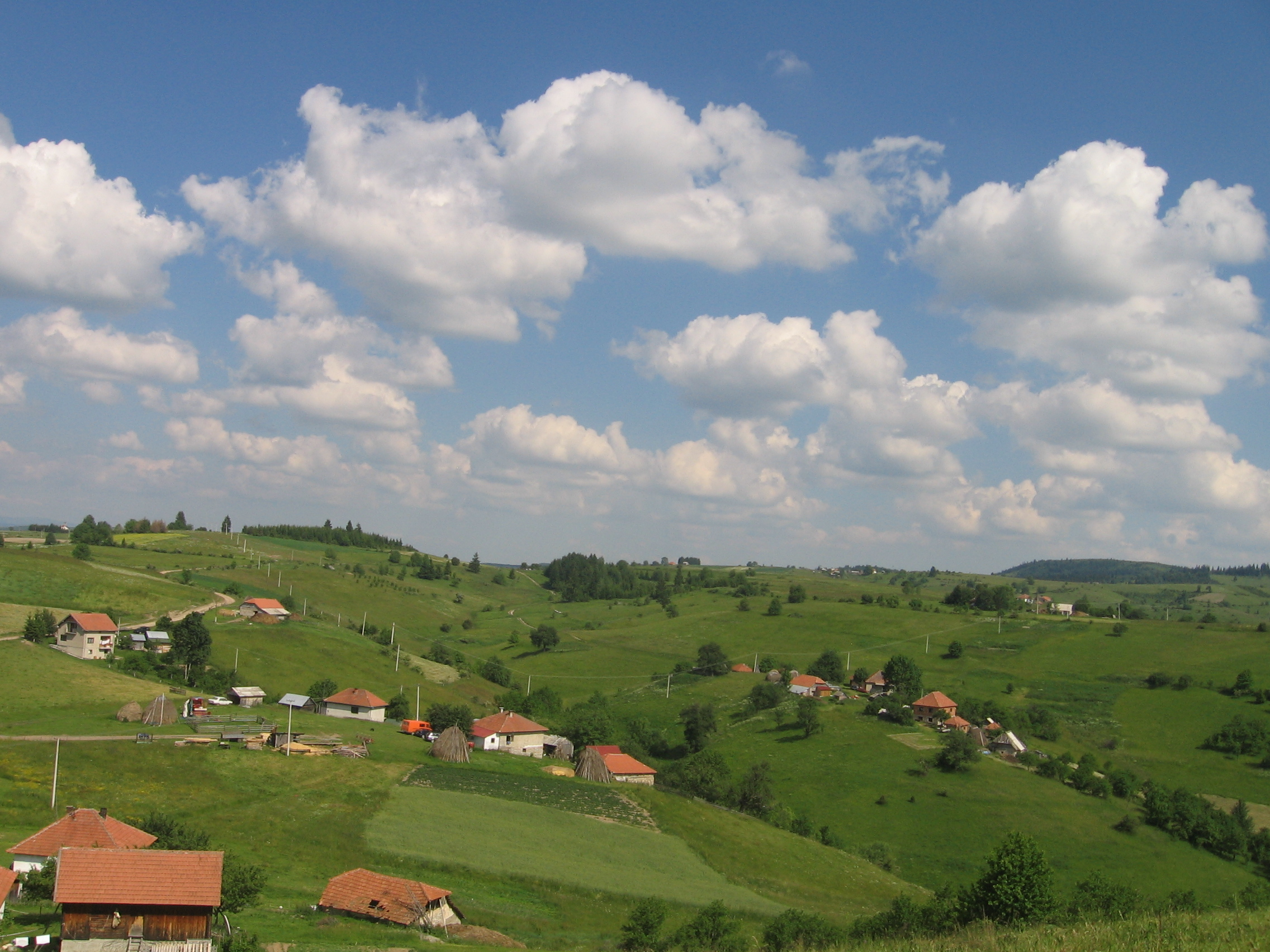

- Location within Serbia
- Coordinates: 43°19′N 19°50′E
- Country: Serbia
- District: Zlatibor District
- Municipality: Prijepolje

Area
  - Land: 17.24 km^{2} (6.66 sq mi)

Population (2002)
  - Total: 196
- Time zone: UTC+1 (CET)
  - Summer (DST): UTC+2 (CEST)

Aljinovići (Serbian Cyrillic: Аљиновићи) is a village in the municipality of Prijepolje, Serbia. According to the 2002 census, the village has a population of 196 people.

== Geography ==
It is situated on a plateau (1150–1270m) between Rupaj (1300m), Zlatarsko Brdo (1350m), Veliki Bitovik (1391m) and Kupionica (1238m), some 35 kilometres southeast from Prijepolje. The village is classified as based on animal husbandry and crops (55.9% agrarian inhabitants). The atar (cadastral area) is 1,724 hectare (2001 source).

The Nova Varoš—Aljinovići regional road towards Sjenica crosses the village.

== History ==
The village name is derived from aljine (dresses); historically, the Orthodox priests in the region had their clothing made from local wool.

In 1889 or 1898 a Serbian school was founded in the village. In the beginning of March 1906, an uprising broke out in the Serbian villages from Sjenica to the villages of Javor (including Aljinovići and neighbouring villages).

In 1939/40, there was 365 pupils and two teachers in the school. In April 1941, at least 34 people from Aljinovići had been taken as prisoners of war and were interned at German camps. In February 1942, there was fighting between the Yugoslav Partisans and the Chetniks in the village.

Today, there are some 50 households in the village, and it is constantly declining.

== Demographic history ==
- 2002 census: 196 people; 98% Serbs
- 1991 census: 304 people

== Culture ==
There is an Orthodox church in the village.

== Anthropology ==
Families include Trmčić, Vujičić, Savković, Milošević, Topalović, among others.
