= Antin, Croatia =

Antin
- Village
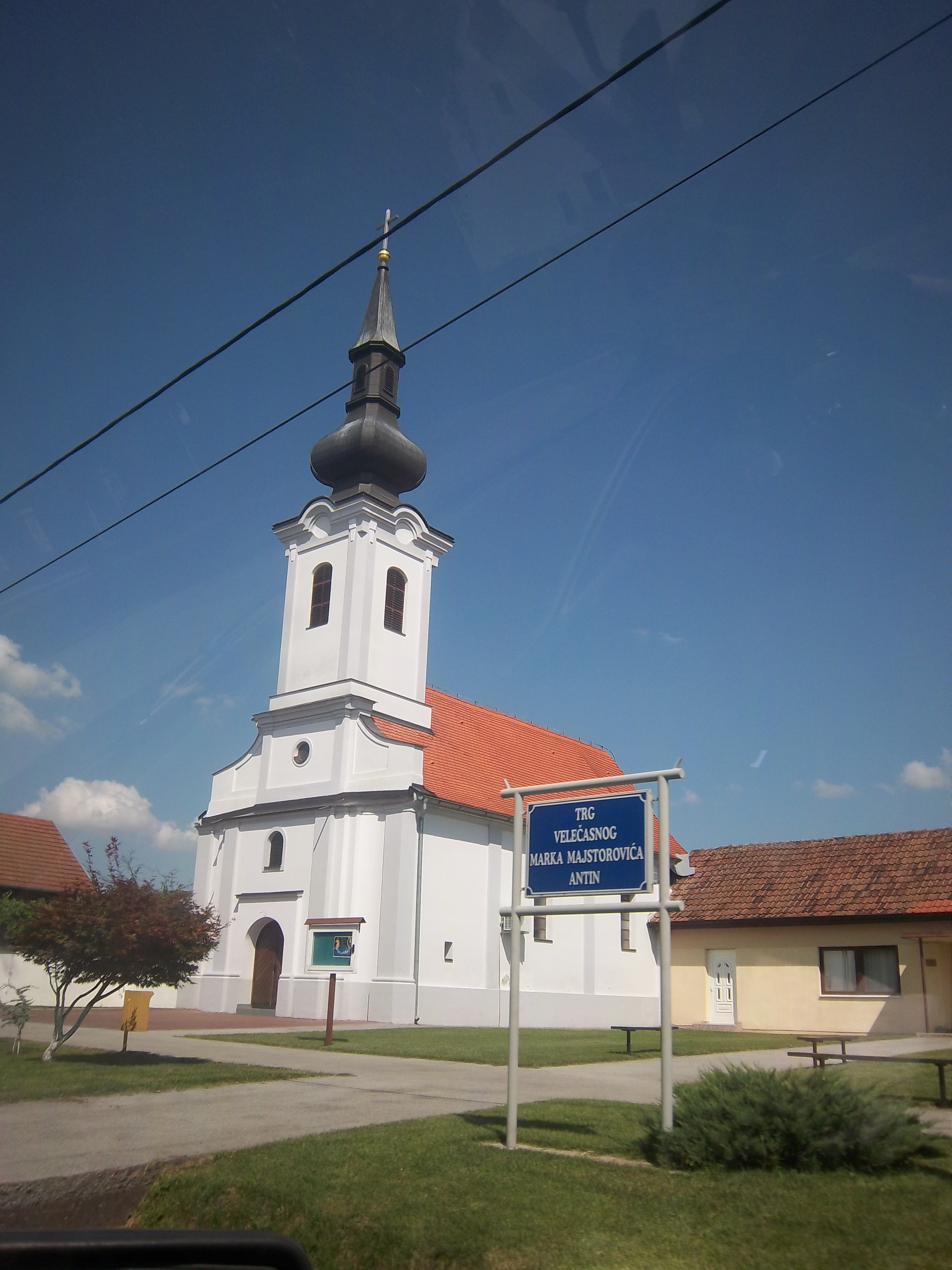

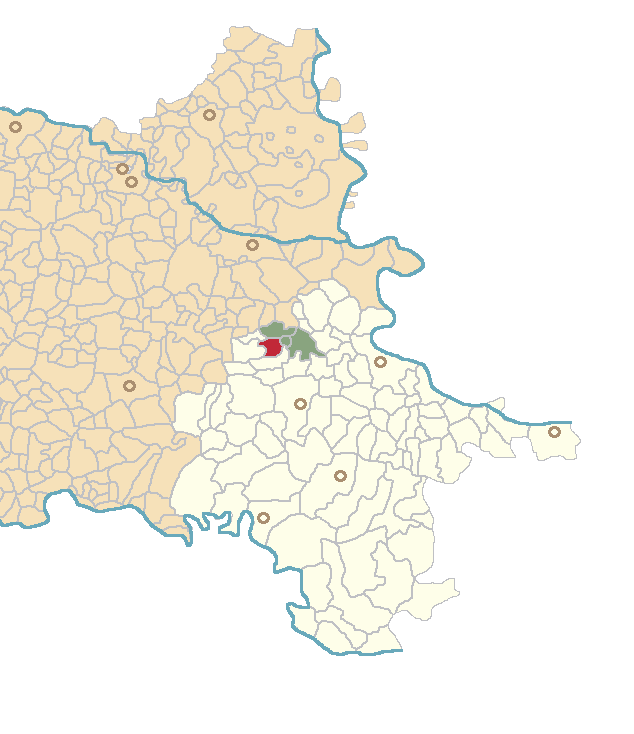

- Location within Vukovar-Syrmia County Location within Croatia Location within Europe
- Coordinates: 45°22′55″N 18°45′3″E
- Country: Croatia
- County: Vukovar-Syrmia
- Municipality: Tordinci

Area
  - Total: 11.6 km^{2} (4.5 sq mi)

Population (2021)
  - Total: 602
  - Density: 51.9/km^{2} (134/sq mi)
- Vehicle registration: VK

Antin is a village located 18 km northwest of Vinkovci in Vukovar-Syrmia County, Croatia. Population 731 (census 2011).

== History ==
Following Ottoman retreat from the region, the Lordship of Vukovar was established, and the village became part of its domain in 1725.

=== Croatian War of Independence ===
During the Croatian War of Independence, access to Antin was cut after insurgent Croatian Serbs blocked the road between Markušica and Antin on 6 April 1991. Serb troops acting as a part of Markušica Territorial Defense Forces (TO) launched several attacks on Antin. The first mortar attacks were recorded on 1 and 2 September 1991, followed up by a machine gun attack on civilians attempting to flee from Antin, and another mortar attack the following day. Mortar attacks were renewed on 29 September, followed by an infantry advance into Antin and capture if the village by the Yugoslav People's Army (JNA) and the TO troops on 30 September.

After the capture, the TO fired mortar rounds against civilian population fleeing towards the village of Korog. At that time, 27 civilians were killed and 10 injured. A mass grave containing the victims was discovered in the village in 1999, and a total of 17 sets of human remains were recovered in Antin by 2012. Since 2002, a 22-kilometre (14 mi) memorial procession is held annually through Tordinci, Antin, Ćelije and Korog—villages where mass graves of 266 Croatian soldiers and civilians were found after the war. In 2011, Croatian State Attorney's office filed charges for war crimes committed in Antin in 1991, reportedly against a Croatian Serb TO officer. Today the President of the Republic of Serbia Tomislav Nikolic was in Antin at the time of the killings of civilians. The role of Nikolic in Antin never clarified.
