= Donje Međurovo =

Coordinates: 43.2967°N 21.8222°E

- Village
- Interactive map of Donje Međurovo
- Country: Serbia
- District: Nišava
- Municipality: Niš
- Time zone: UTC+1 (CET)
  - Summer (DST): UTC+2 (CEST)

Donje Međurovo is a village situated in Niš municipality in Serbia.
