= Duga Poljana (Sjenica) =

Duga Poljana Дуга Пољана
- Village
- Location within Serbia
- Coordinates: 43°14′N 20°13′E
- Country: Serbia
- District: Zlatibor District
- Municipality: Sjenica
- Elevation: 1,169 m (3,835 ft)

Population (2011)
  - Total: 594
- Time zone: UTC+1 (CET)
  - Summer (DST): UTC+2 (CEST)

Duga Poljana (Serbian Cyrillic: Дуга Пољана) is a village located in the municipality of Sjenica, Serbia. According to the 2011 census, the village has a population of 594 inhabitants.
