= Home of the Army =

Building in Belgrade

- Dom vojske
- Veterans' Club
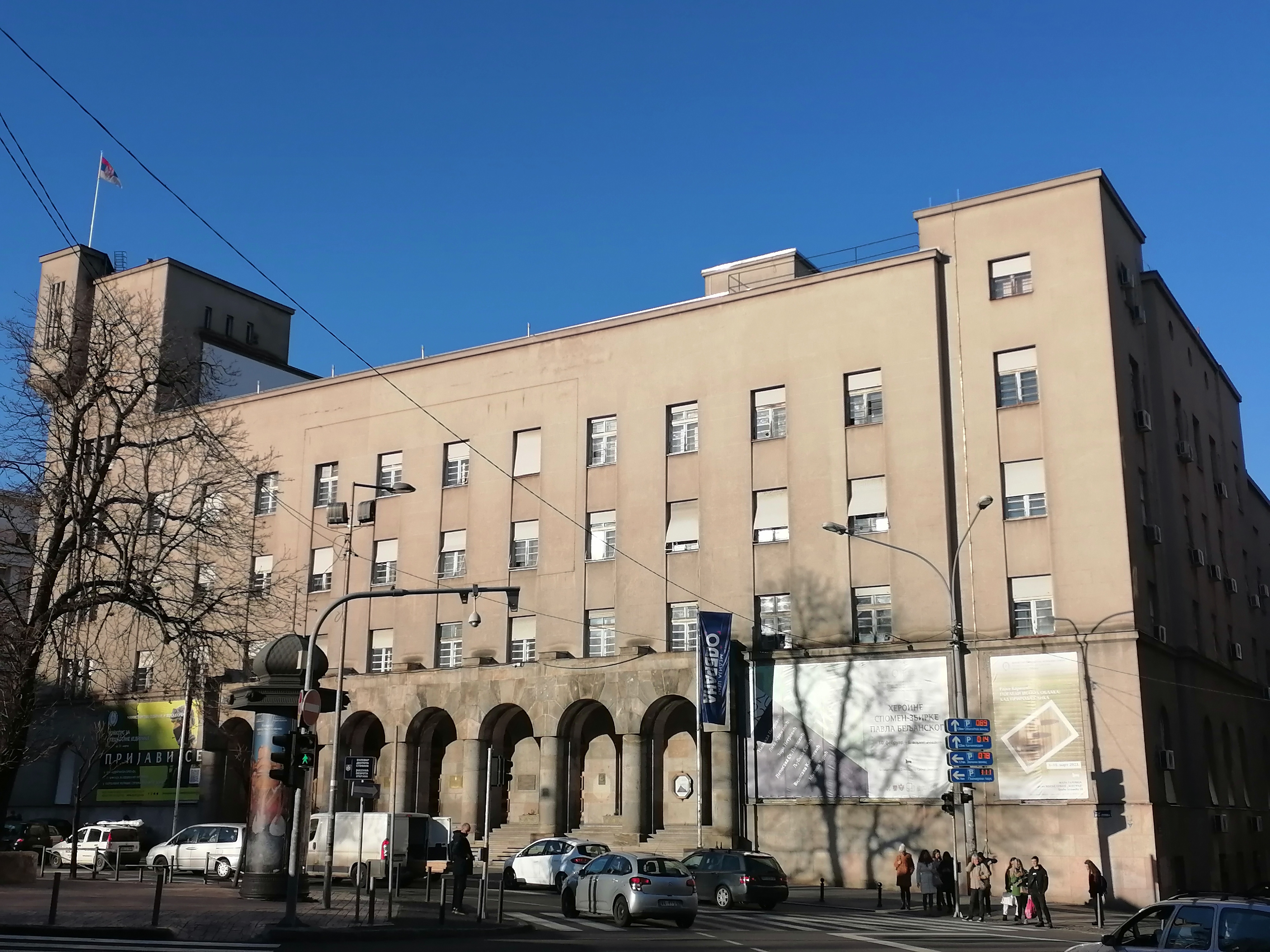
- Interactive map of Home of the Army
- Former names: Veterans' Club, Home of the JNA
- Address: 19 Braće Jugovića Street, Stari Grad; Belgrade; Serbia
- Coordinates: 44.817039°N 20.462312°E
- Operator: Ministry of Defence
- Designation: Cultural property
- Current use: venue

Construction
- Built: October 1930–1932
- Opened: 29 May 1932
- Expanded: 1939

The Home of the Army (Serbian: Дом војске/Dom vojske) or Warrior House Palace (Палата Ратнички дом), formerly the Veterans' Club (Ратнички дом) at 19 Braće Jugovića Street in Belgrade, is a monumental building today housing the Military Club of Serbia, whose basic activities are informing and education of the members of the Serbian Army and the civilian sector through numerous cultural activities such as: exhibitions, concerts, book promotions, public discussions, lectures etc. The premises of the club are used as a venue for receptions, conferences, seminars, presentations, fairs, business meetings, cocktails, balls and fashion shows.

== History ==
=== Concept and design ===
In early 1929, the decision was made to establish a Veterans Club in Belgrade, as the central cultural institution of the armed forces and reserve officers. A competition was launched by the Association of the Reserve Officers and Veterans to find suitable designs. Thirty-one entries were submitted, and the jury – whose members among others were Petar Popović, Svetozar Jovanović and Dragutin Maslać – assessed that none of the thirty-one submitted entries deserved the first prize, arguing that none of them could be further developed without considerable prior modifications, particularly to the facades. Two equal second prizes were awarded, to the work of Živko Piperski and Jovan Jovanović, and to the work of Bogdan Nestorović and Jovan Šnajder, and the final right for the realisation was given to Piperski and Jovanović, with the proviso that they should bring it into harmony with the design of Nestorović and Šnajder. On the other hand, the prevailing opinion of the expert public favoured the design by Branislav Marinković as an original composition in a modernized Serbian-Byzantine style. The design by Piperski and Jovanović was conceived in the style of аcademism, as a monumental Palace with a prominent cornice and a colonnade of pilasters, which was similar to the General Headquarters Building, designed by the architect Wilhelm von Baumgarten, built some time earlier. Unlike them, the facade proposed by Nestorović and Šnajder's design was described as Byzantine-Romanesque, and because of the interaction of different cultural traditions suggested by such a combination, this type of stylistic formulation was considered a desirable model of the national style which enjoyed popularity in the 1920s and 1930s. The final version of the accepted design was considerably different from both second prize winning proposals. Instead of elaborate eclectic architectural ornament, a restrained modernist concept was applied.

The lot for the construction of the club was donated by the Administration of the City of Belgrade, as a gift to former veterans, and the club was built from donations from the members of the National Defense, the subventions given by the patron king Aleksandar the Unifier, and from civilian organizations. The construction began in October 1930 and the building was dedicated on 29 May 1932.

=== Interwar years and World War II ===
The facility was to serve as a headquarters for several national, cultural, and humanitarian associations on the model of the so-called peoples' houses in Czechoslovakia, Poland and elsewhere. Apart from the Association of Reserve Officers and Soldiers, the building became home to the Adriatic Guards, Volunteers Association, Sokol Union, Society of the Friends of France, Shooting Association, Fencing Club and Actors Association Fund. In addition to offices, two reception halls and a restaurant, the building's fourth and fifth floor served as a hotel, whose accommodation capacity was reinforced by the addition of the wing facing Simina Street in 1939. One part of the club was intended for the accommodation of guests from the rest of the country.

After the invasion and occupation of Yugoslavia in April 1941, the building was used by the German occupying authority. In August 1941, Wehrmacht officers moved in and the building became the Gestapo Headquarters for the entire Balkan region.

=== Socialist period ===
On victory day, 9 May 1946, the building was officially established as the Yugoslav Army Club (Serbo-Croatian: Dom JNA). The first post-war commander and head of the club was professor, colonel, academic painter and graphic artist, Branko Šotra. In 1984, the City of Belgrade Assembly designated the club as cultural property. Since 2010, the club has become the seat of the Мultimеdia centre "Defence" and the Artistic ensemble "Stanislav Binički".

== Architecture ==
The prominent restrained concept of the front of the building, with no ornaments applied, especially in the first to third floor zone perforated with sets of vertically aligned windows. The distinctive accent in the ground-floor zone is the central loggia with its slightly protruding arcade supported by massive columns and fronted by a wide flight of stairs. A particularly prominent feature of the building is the corner tower which somewhat relieves the monotony of the front façade, while emphasising the building's expressive monumentality and military character. The idea behind the tower, inspired by medieval and Renaissance models in form, was to emphasise the physical presence of the building and, on the symbolical level, to function as a visual statement of its military character. The symbolism of such an architectural program is best summed up in the words of Мilutin Borisavljević in the magazine Pravda, from 24 May 1929: "Veterans Club needed to be framed in soldierly terms, in the form of a fortress, a medieval castle with turrets and donjons, with perhaps somewhat brutal forms, a character of masculinity, heroism and more. Architecture is a symbolic art: the exterior of a building should be expressive of its use." This symbolism was also to be expressed by a proposed but unrealised sculptural program consisting of eight individual statues, one above each column of the loggia: a medieval armoured warrior of the Nemanjić age and of the age of emperor Stefan Dušan, a Battle of Kosovo warrior, a gusle bard, a Serbian revolutionary, a soldier of the 1876 War of Independence, a First Balkan War soldier, and a Yugoslav soldier of 1918. Such an iconographic concept and historical sequence was meant to highlight the continuity of the struggle for the liberation and unification of the South Slavs in keeping with the promoted ideology of Yugoslavism. The founders intended the facility to serve as a headquarters. Based on its cultural, historical, architectural and townscape merit, the Veterans Club Building at 19 Braće Jugovića Street in Belgrade was designated as a cultural heritage property in 1984.

== Gallery ==
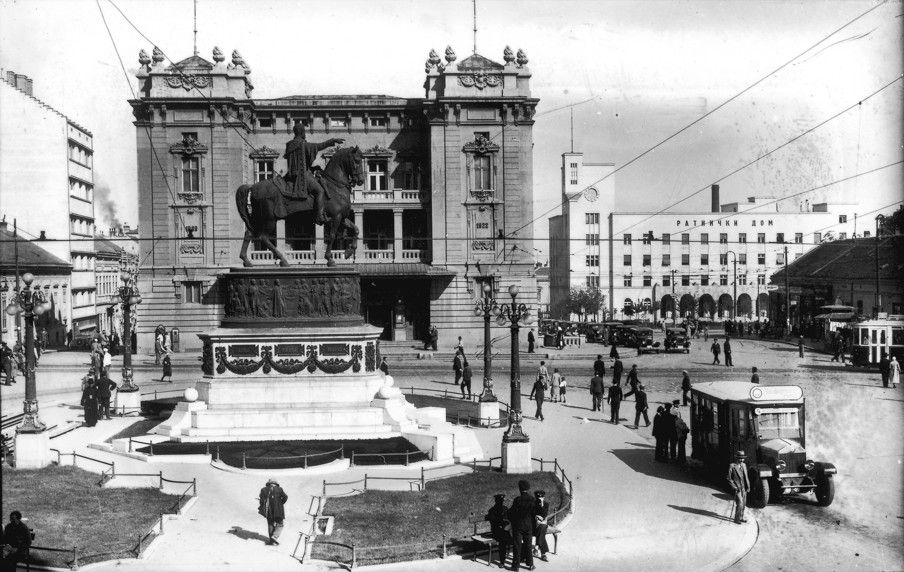
Veterans Club Building, c.1935

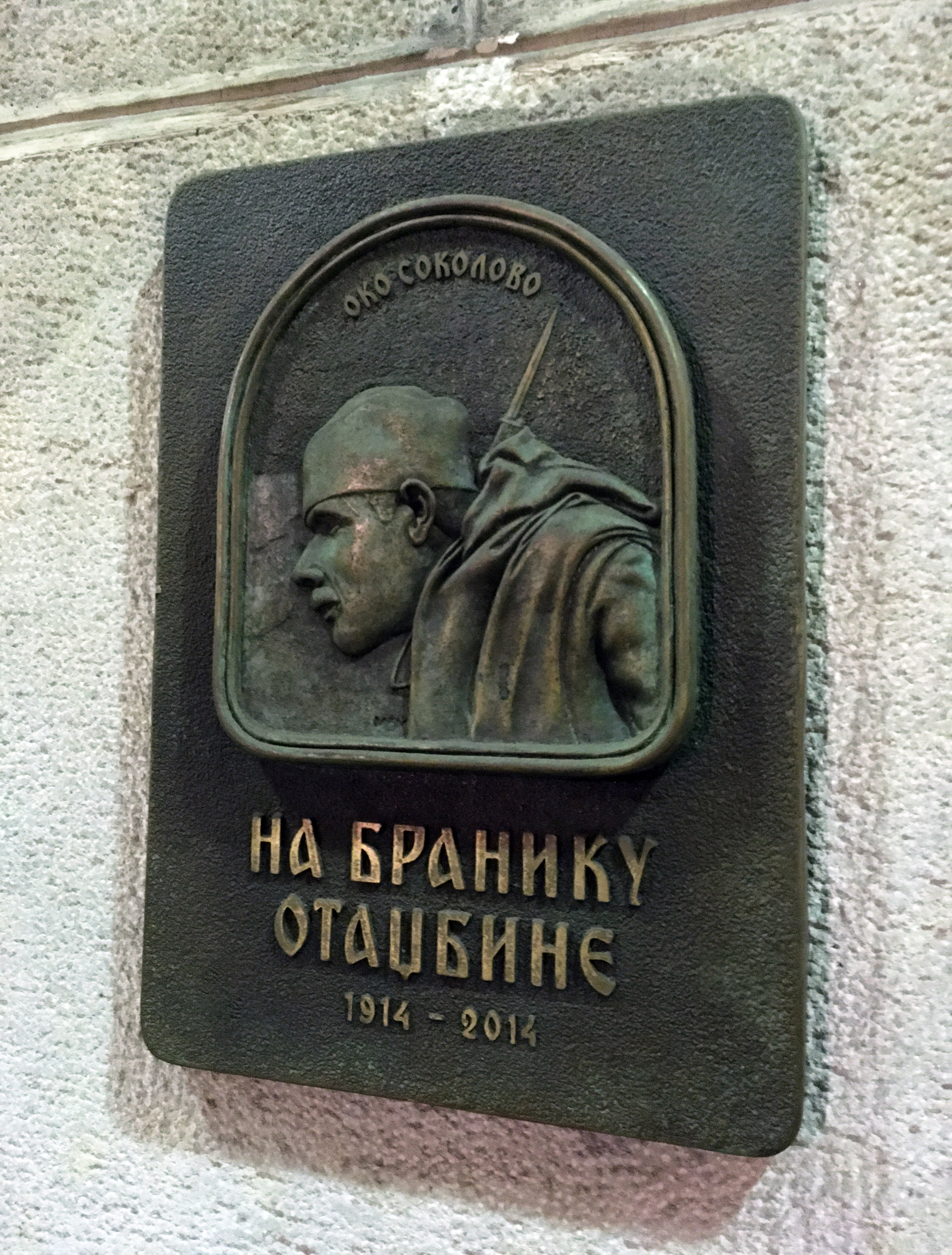
"Oko Sokolovo" relief monument

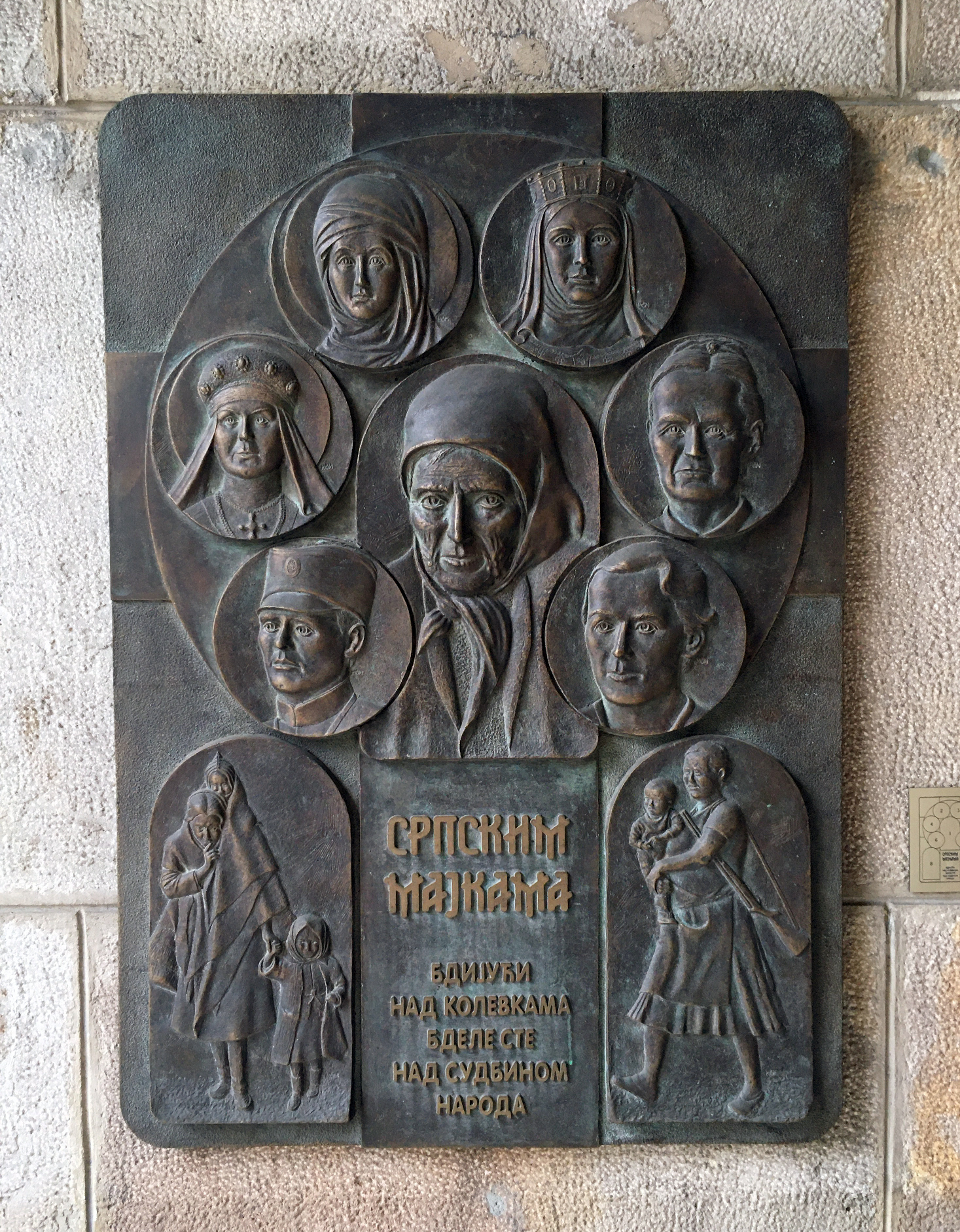
"Srpskim majkama" relief monument
