= Gabrovo, Strumica =

Gabrovo Габрово
- Village
- Location within North Macedonia
- Coordinates: 41.377372°N 22.798079°E
- Country: North Macedonia
- Region: Southeastern
- Municipality: Strumica

Population (2002)
  - Total: 399
- Time zone: UTC+1 (CET)
  - Summer (DST): UTC+2 (CEST)
- Website: .

Gabrovo (Macedonian: Габрово) is a village in the municipality of Strumica, North Macedonia.

== Demographics ==
According to the 2002 census, the village had a total of 399 inhabitants. Ethnic groups in the village include:

- Macedonians 398
- Others 1
