= Svrljiški Timok =

River in Serbia

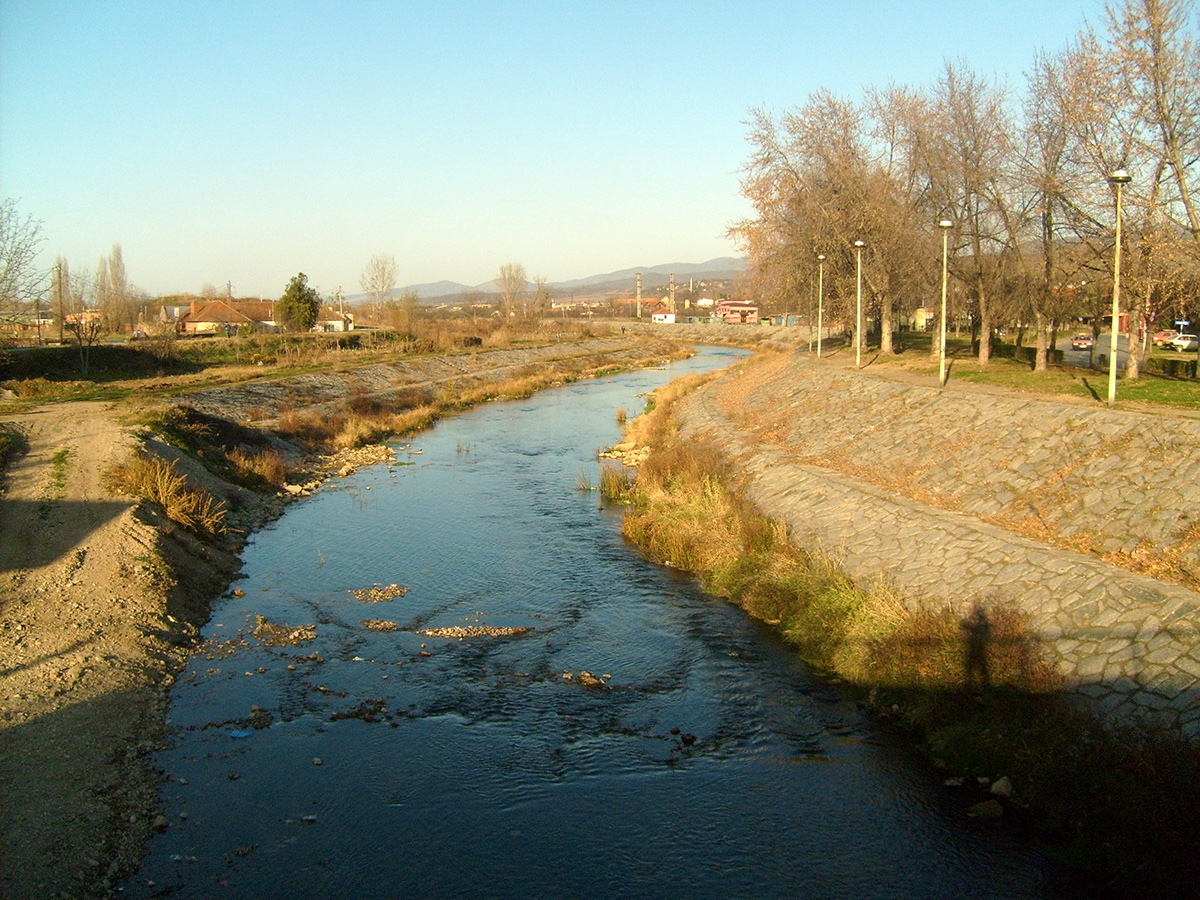
- Native name: Сврљишки Тимок (Serbian)

Location
- Country: Serbia
- City: Svrljig, Knjaževac.

Physical characteristics
- Source: Šesti Gabar
- Mouth: Beli Timok
  - location: Knjaževac
  - coordinates: 43°34′31″N 22°15′33″E
- Length: 64 km (40 mi)
- Basin size: 726 km^{2} (280 sq mi)

The Svrljiški Timok (Serbian Cyrillic: Сврљишки Тимок, "Timok of Svrljig") is a river in Serbia, headwater of the Beli Timok. It rises north of the Mountains of Svrljig near the village of Šesti Gabar at elevation 1,078 m and flows to the west, curving around the northern slopes of the Mountains of Svrljig. It passes through many villages (Vlagovo, Manojlica, Guševac, Lozan, Okruglica, Crnoljevica, Beloinje), reaching the town of Svrljig, that gives its name to the river, which here gently turns to the north, and after passing through Niševac and Varoš makes a complete turn to the north-east. It runs through Palilula, Podvis and Rgošte, reaching Knjaževac, where it meets the Trgoviški Timok and together they form the Beli Timok. The total length of the river is 64 km; the area of the river basin is 726 km^{2} (280 sq mi).

== Tributaries ==
The tributaries of the Svrljiški Timok are:

Left: Turija, Prazačkka, Kalnicka, Bela, Dolčina, Rakinak, Glogovačka, Grazinska

Right: Izvorska, Rgoški
