= Gramada (Svrljig) =

Mountain pass in Serbia

- Грамада
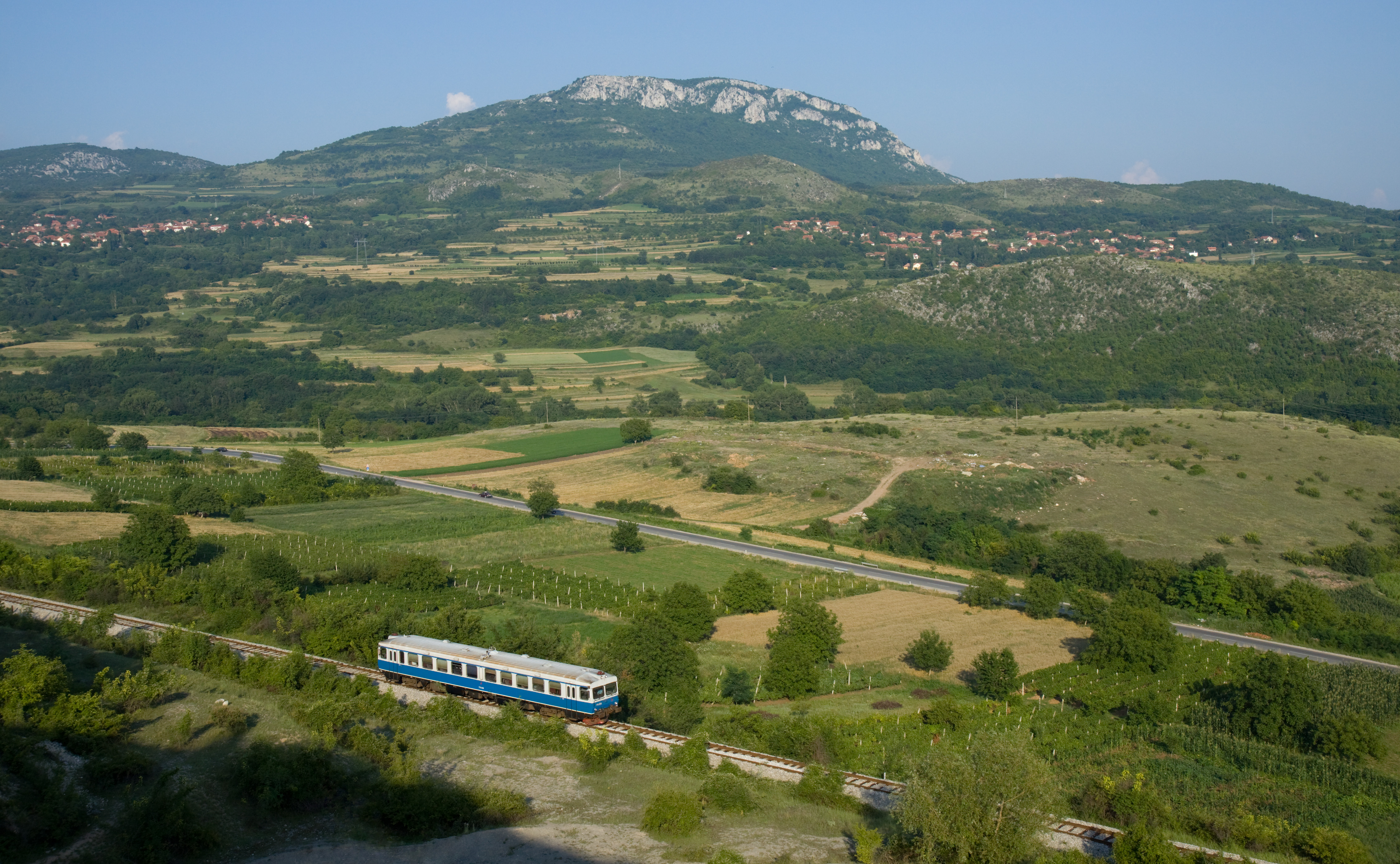
- View of Gramada Pass from the south side. The village of Jasenovik is on the left, and Vrelo is on the right. The Gramada Pass can be seen on the right, above the village of Vrelo.

Highest point
- Elevation: 555 m (1,821 ft)
- Coordinates: 43°22′22″N 22°02′26″E

Geography
- Location within Serbia
- Location: Serbia
- Parent range: Svrljig Mountains

Gramada Pass (Serbian: Грамада), a mountain pass in Svrljig mountains between Niš and Svrljig Valley in Serbia.

== Geography ==
Gramada is a mountain pass at the western end of the Svrljig mountains, 555 m above sea level. This pass has long been the easiest traffic connection between the Niš Valley in the south and the Svrljig Valley in the north. The main road between Niš and Zaječar passes through Gramada, via Svrljig and Knjaževac. The nearest settlements are Vrelo and Jasenovik (southwest of Gramada, in the city of Niš) and Prekonoga and Merdželat (east of Gramada, in the municipality of Svrljig).

== History ==
Archaeological remains of a small settlement from the 3rd century were discovered at the Gramada pass. In the period from 1833 to 1878, there was a border crossing and a border fort between the Principality of Serbia and the Ottoman Empire at Gramada. At the main road between Niš and Knjaževac, Gramada had a great military and strategic importance at the time: several battles were fought there in the Serbian-Ottoman wars (1876-1878) and the Timok Rebellion (1883).
