= Kalafat (mountain) =

Mountain in Serbia

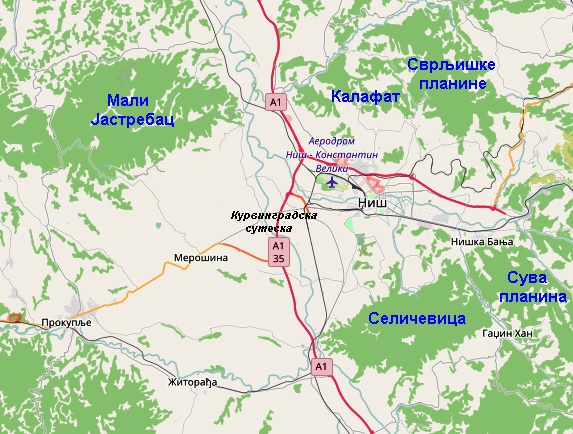
- Kalafat is located north of Niš

Highest point
- Peak: Kalafat
- Elevation: 837 m (2,746 ft)
- Coordinates: 43°23′49″N 21°59′04″E

Dimensions
- Length: 20 km (12 mi)
- Width: 10 km (6.2 mi)

Geography
- Location within Serbia
- Country: Serbia

Kalafat or Kurilovo is a mountain located in southeastern Serbia.

== Geography ==
The name is derived from the translation of the Gramada in the east, to the passage of Turin to the west, from where the Popova Glava begins. In the south it is limited by the Niš valley, and in the north by the Toponica and Kopajkosarsko rivers. It extends 15 km, and on the meridian 11 km, between the villages of Gornji Matejevac and Popsica. Kalafat from the south is surrounded by Niš and the villages of Kamenica, Matejevac and Knez Selo, and from the north of the villages of Grbavče, Kopajkosara and Cerje.

== Peaks ==
Its highest peak is Kalafat (837 m). Two peaks are higher than 800 meters, and ten peaks are higher than 700 meters.
