= Okruglica =

Okruglica may refer to:

- Okruglica (Svrljig), a village in Serbia
- Okruglica (Trstenik), a village in Serbia
