= Đurinac =

Đurinac may refer to:

- Đurinac (Svrljig), a village in Serbia
- Đurinac (Svilajnac), a village in Serbia
