= Gramada =

Gramada may refer to:

- Gramada, Bulgaria
- Gramada (Bujanovac), village in the municipality of Bujanovac, Serbia
- Gramada (mountain)
- Gramada (Svrljig), a mountain pass between Niš and Svrljig
- Ion Grămadă, Bukovinian Romanian writer

== See also ==
- Hramada, cognate term in Belarus
