= Milija Miletić =

Serbian politician (born 1968)

- Милија Милетић
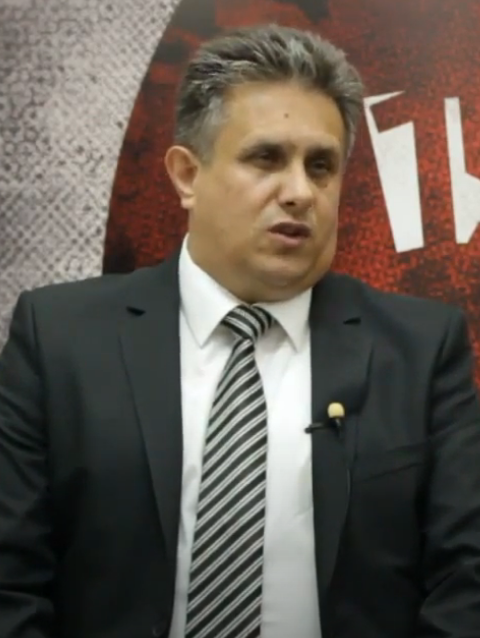
- Miletić in 2014

Member of the National Assembly
- Incumbent
- Assumed office 16 April 2014

Leader of the United Peasant Party
- Incumbent
- Assumed office 2010

President of the Municipality of Svrljig
- In office 2008–2014 (Note: Miletić was removed from office by the municipal assembly in December 2009 and returned to the position four months later.)

Personal details
- Born: 24 October 1968 (age 58) Plužina, SR Serbia, SFR Yugoslavia
- Party: United Peasant Party
- Occupation: Veterinary technician

Milija Miletić (Serbian: Милија Милетић; born 24 October 1968) is a Serbian politician who has led the United Peasant Party (USS) since its registration in 2010. He has been a member of the National Assembly since 2014, elected each time on the electoral list of the Serbian Progressive Party (SNS), and was re-elected to a sixth term in the 2026 snap election on the "Aleksandar Vučić – United Serbia" list, which lost the election to the Student List. Before entering the National Assembly, he was president of the municipality of Svrljig for most of the period from 2008 to 2014.

== Early life and career ==
Miletić was born on 24 October 1968 in the village of Plužina near Svrljig, in what was then the Socialist Republic of Serbia in the Socialist Federal Republic of Yugoslavia. He lives in Svrljig. A veterinary technician by profession, he worked as a field veterinarian and was a trade union activist before entering politics.

== Political career ==
=== Municipal politics ===
Miletić ran unsuccessfully for mayor of Svrljig in the 2004 local elections, in which mayors were directly elected. He was chosen as the municipality's deputy mayor after the election and served in this role for the next four years.

The direct election of mayors was abandoned with the 2008 local elections. The United Peasant Party won a plurality in the Svrljig assembly election, and Miletić was chosen as mayor when the assembly convened. He was removed from office by the assembly in December 2009 but returned to power four months later through an alliance with the Serbian Radical Party.

Although the United Peasant Party had existed as a de facto political party since 2000, it was not registered until 2010. Miletić was recognised as the party's first official leader.

He was chosen for another term as mayor after the 2012 local elections and served until 2014, when he resigned after being elected to the National Assembly. He has remained active in local politics as a member of the Svrljig municipal assembly. For the 2016 local elections, he arranged an alliance between the United Peasant Party and the Serbian Progressive Party in the municipality. Notwithstanding some subsequent disagreements between the parties, he was re-elected to the local assembly in the 2020 local elections at the head of the Progressive Party's coalition list.

In the 2024 local elections, the United Peasant Party ran separately from the Progressives, with Miletić leading the list "We Know Each Other – Milija Miletić" (Znamo se – Milija Miletić). He said the list was made up of people who had been with him from the start and that he expected it to win a majority on its own, while describing the parliamentary election, in which he had run on the SNS list, as a separate matter. The list won the most votes and seats, ahead of the SNS-led "Aleksandar Vučić – Svrljig Tomorrow". The United Peasant Party then formed a local government with the Progressives, and incumbent mayor Miroslav Marković of the USS was confirmed for a new term on 30 June 2024.

=== Member of the National Assembly ===
==== 2014–2020 ====
Miletić received the ninety-seventh position on the Progressive Party's Aleksandar Vučić – Future We Believe In electoral list in the 2014 Serbian parliamentary election and was elected when the list won a landslide victory with 158 of 250 seats. He received the same position on the Progressive-led Aleksandar Vučić – Serbia is Winning list in the 2016 election and was re-elected when the list won a second consecutive majority with 131 seats.

In the 2016–2020 parliament, Miletić was a member of the agriculture, forestry and water management committee, a deputy member of the committee on the rights of the child, and the chair of a subcommittee for monitoring agriculture in the most underdeveloped areas of Serbia. He was also a member of Serbia's delegation to the parliamentary assembly of the Organization of the Black Sea Economic Cooperation, the head of Serbia's parliamentary friendship group with Slovenia, and a member of more than thirty other friendship groups. He served in the Movement of Socialists–People's Peasant Party–United Peasant Party parliamentary group, which supported the Progressive-led government.

==== 2020–2026 ====
Miletić received the eighty-fourth position on the Progressive Party's Aleksandar Vučić – For Our Children list in the 2020 Serbian parliamentary election and was elected to a third term when the list won a landslide majority with 188 seats. In that parliament, he continued to serve on the agriculture committee, was a member of the committee on the rights of the child and a deputy member of the committee on labour, social issues, social inclusion and poverty reduction, and remained in the delegation to the Black Sea Economic Cooperation parliamentary assembly and head of the friendship group with Slovenia. In December 2020, he formed a parliamentary group with the four members of the Justice and Reconciliation Party (SPP) and became its deputy head.

He was sixty-second on the Aleksandar Vučić – Together We Can Do Everything list in the 2022 election, and was re-elected when the list won 120 seats. In the 13th National Assembly, he was again deputy head of a group led by the SPP, For Reconciliation SPP–USS–DSHV, headed by Usame Zukorlić and including the Democratic Alliance of Croats in Vojvodina.

In the 2023 election, he was sixty-second on the Aleksandar Vučić – Serbia Must Not Stop list, which won 129 seats; his mandate in the 14th National Assembly was confirmed on 6 February 2024. In that parliament, he was a member of the Healthy Serbia – Russian Party – United Peasant Party group, and later deputy head of the Workers' Party – Russian Party – United Peasant Party group, headed by Željko Veselinović.

==== 2026–present ====
In the 2026 snap election, Miletić was ninety-sixth on the SNS-led Aleksandar Vučić – United Serbia list, on which the United Peasant Party took part as a coalition partner. The list won 1,731,323 votes (39.48%) and 103 seats, finishing second behind the Student List, and Miletić was re-elected to his sixth term. His mandate in the 15th National Assembly was confirmed on 17 November 2026, and he joined the "Aleksandar Vučić – Serbia Wins" parliamentary group.

== Personal life ==
Miletić is known for appearing in the National Assembly in elements of Serbian traditional clothing. At the October 2020 session at which a new government was elected, he wore traditional opanci with a suit, which drew attention on social media. According to the pro-government daily Večernje novosti, he often attends sessions in folk costume, and Assembly president Ivica Dačić once jokingly called him the "most handsome deputy".

== Electoral record ==
=== Local (Municipality of Svrljig) ===
2004 Municipality of Svrljig local election: Mayor of Svrljig
Candidate	Party	First round		Second round	
Candidate	Party	Votes	%	Votes	%
Saša Golubović (incumbent)	G17 Plus		18.71	3,408	62.88
Radiša Savić	Socialist Party of Serbia		13.90	2,012	37.12
Vlastimir Milkić	Movement for Svrljig "New Serbia"		12.50		
Aleksandar Batanjac	Citizens' Group: Sloga				
Slavica Božinović	Democratic Party				
Mariola Gagić	Citizens' Group				
Srbislav Đorđević	Serbian Radical Party				
Mašan Jovanović	Serbian Renewal Movement				
Zoran Lazarević	Strength of Serbia Movement–Bogoljub Karić				
Milinko Marković	Democratic Party of Serbia				
Milija Miletić	United Peasant Party				
Srboljub Milovanović	Citizens' Group				
Gordon Perić	Citizens' Group				
Vlastimir Petrović	Citizens' Group: Radoš Božinović				
Total				5,420	100.00

2024 Municipality of Svrljig local election: Municipal assembly
Party	Votes	%	Seats
We Know Each Other – Milija Miletić (United Peasant Party)	2,714	43.42	12
Aleksandar Vučić – Svrljig Tomorrow (SNS, SPS, PUPS, JS, SRS, Oathkeepers)	2,219	35.50	10
Citizens' Group: Movement for the Salvation of Svrljig	698	11.17	3
Serbia Against Violence – Svrljig (Democratic Party)	252	4.03	1
We – Power of the People, Prof. Branimir Nestorović – Svrljig	204	3.26	1
New DSS for a Better Svrljig	78	1.25	–
Roma Unity Party	71	1.14	–
Roma Union of Serbia	15	0.24	–
Total	6,251	100.00	27
Valid votes	6,251	97.38	
Invalid/blank votes	168	2.62	
Total votes	6,419	100.00	
Registered voters/turnout	10,179	63.06	
Source: Službeni list Grada Niša, vol. 32, no. 62 (6 June 2024), pp. 10–11.
