= Palilula (Svrljig) =

Palilula Палилула
- Village
- Location within Serbia
- Coordinates: 43°29′23″N 22°06′43″E
- Country: Serbia
- District: Nišava District
- Municipality: Svrljig

Population (2002)
  - Total: 75
- Time zone: UTC+1 (CET)
  - Summer (DST): UTC+2 (CEST)

Palilula (Serbian Cyrillic: Палилула, pronounced [pǎlilula]) is a village in the municipality of Svrljig, Serbia. According to the 2002 census, the village has a population of 75 people.
