= Gulijan =

- Village
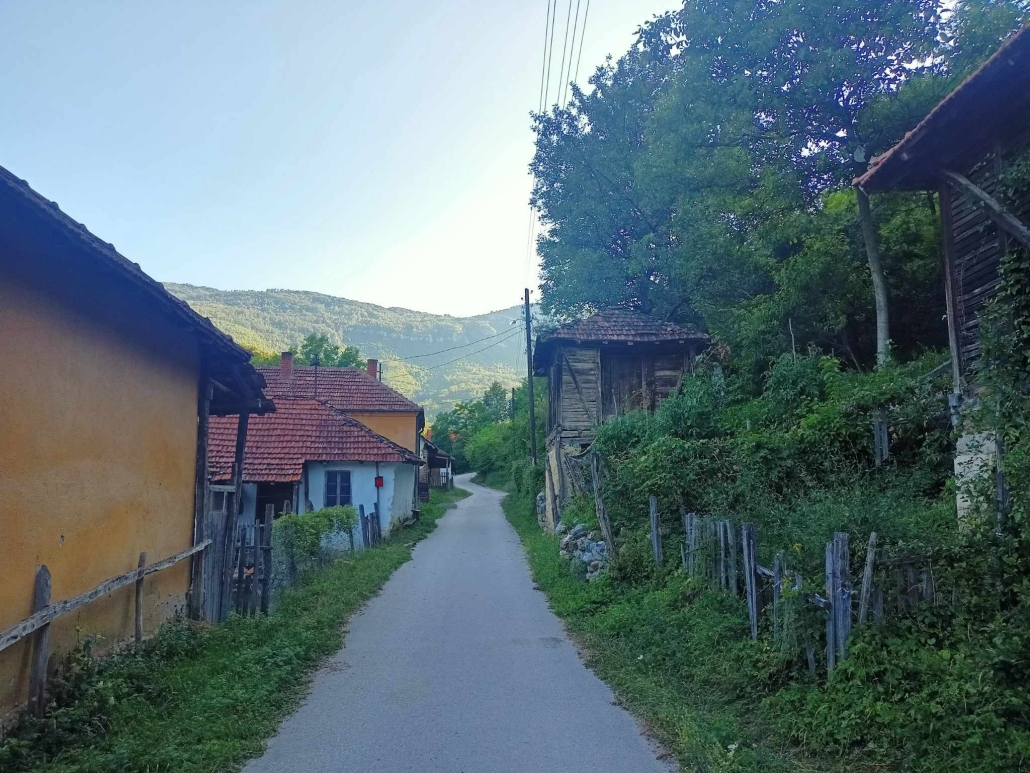
- Photo inside of Gulijan

- Location within Serbia
- Coordinates: 43°21′48″N 22°15′01″E
- Country: Serbia
- District: Nišava District
- Municipality: Svrljig

Population (2022)
  - Total: ▼80
- Time zone: UTC+1 (CET)
  - Summer (DST): UTC+2 (CEST)

Gulijan is a village in the municipality of Svrljig, Serbia. According to the 2022 census, the village has a population of 80 people.
