= Tijovac =

Tijovac may refer to:

- Tijovac (Kuršumlija), a village in Serbia
- Tijovac (Svrljig), a village in Serbia
