= Okolište, Svrljig =

Okolište Околиште
- Village
- Location within Serbia
- Coordinates: 43°25′20″N 22°16′21″E
- Country: Serbia
- Region: Southern and Eastern Serbia
- District: Nišava
- Municipality: Svrljig
- Elevation: 1,982 ft (604 m)

Population (2011)
  - Total: 92
- Time zone: UTC+1 (CET)
  - Summer (DST): UTC+2 (CEST)

Okolište is a village in the municipality of Svrljig, Serbia. According to the 2011 census, the village has a population of 92 inhabitants.

== Population ==
Population of Okolište
1948	1953	1961	1971	1981	1991	2002	2011
561	580	521	432	298	237	141	92
