= Lalinac (Svrljig) =

Lalinac Лалинац
- Village
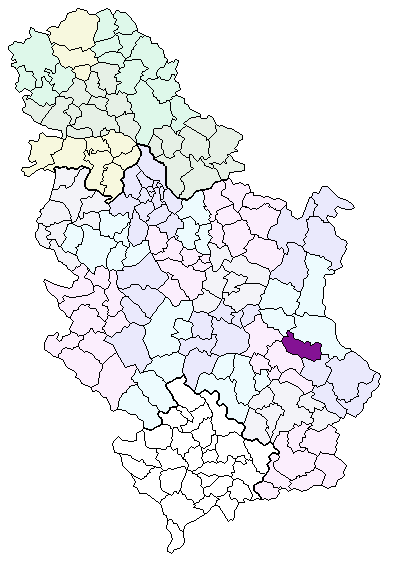
- Location of Svrljig municipality in Serbia

- Location within Serbia
- Country: Serbia
- Region: Southern and Eastern Serbia
- District: Nišava
- Municipality: Svrljig

Population (2002)
  - Total: 445
- Time zone: UTC+1 (CET)
  - Summer (DST): UTC+2 (CEST)

Lalinac (Serbian: Лалинац) is a village in the municipality of Svrljig, Serbia and the district of Nišava. According to the 2002 census, the village has a population of 445 people. all Serbs.

== See also ==
- List of cities, towns and villages in Serbia (A-M)
- List of cities in Serbia
