= Gojmanovac =

- Village
- Location within Serbia
- Coordinates: 43°28′51″N 21°55′36″E
- Country: Serbia
- District: Nišava District
- Municipality: Svrljig

Population (2002)
  - Total: 94
- Time zone: UTC+1 (CET)
  - Summer (DST): UTC+2 (CEST)

Gojmanovac is a village in the municipality of Svrljig, Serbia. According to the 2002 census, the village has a population of 194 people.
