= Labukovo =

- Village
- Location within Serbia
- Coordinates: 43°30′20″N 21°56′17″E
- Country: Serbia
- District: Nišava District
- Municipality: Svrljig

Population (2002)
  - Total: 122
- Time zone: UTC+1 (CET)
  - Summer (DST): UTC+2 (CEST)

Labukovo is a village in the municipality of Svrljig, Serbia. It had a population of 122 at the 2002 census.
