= Drajinac =

- Village
- Location within Serbia
- Coordinates: 43°27′20″N 22°08′55″E
- Country: Serbia
- District: Nišava District
- Municipality: Svrljig

Population (2002)
  - Total: 706
- Time zone: UTC+1 (CET)
  - Summer (DST): UTC+2 (CEST)

Drajinac is a village in the municipality of Svrljig, Serbia. According to the 2002 census, the village has a population of 706 people.

== Demographics ==
In the village Drajinac live 610 adult inhabitants, and the average age is 49.2 years (48.3 for men and 50.2 for women). The village has 240 households, and the average number of people per household is 2.94. This village is largely populated by Serbs (according to the census of 2002).
