= Gornji Bučumet =

Gornji Bučumet Горњи Бучумет (Serbian)
- Settlement
- Location within Serbia
- Coordinates: 42°55′N 21°37′E
- Country: Serbia
- District: Jablanica District
- Municipality: Medveđa

Population (2002)
  - Total: 139
- Time zone: UTC+1 (CET)
  - Summer (DST): UTC+2 (CEST)
- Postal code: 16240
- Area code: +381 16

Gornji Bučumet (Serbian Cyrillic: Горњи Бучумет) is a settlement in the municipality of Medveđa, in southern Serbia. According to the 2002 census, the village had a population of 139 people.

== Name ==
The name bučumet is derived from Turkish bućumiš, which means thick, impassable forest.

According to B. Simeonov, the toponym is of Thraco-Roman origin.

== Geography ==
The village of Bučumet is composed out of three mahala (neighbourhoods): Upper, Lower (Доњи) and Middle (Средњи) Bučumet, which are all settlements registered separately in the census. The three settlements lie in the South Morava basin, above the Jablanica river, and as such are located in the Upper Jablanica region. The highest mountain in Upper Bučumet is Paramid (853), with the mountain of Sv. Petar (1149) being located in Middle Bučumet. The three neighbourhoods of Bučumet are 470 to 853 metres above sea level.

== History ==
There is a medieval church built on the ruins of an older church.

During the Toplica-Jablanica Operation (Топличко-јабланичка операција 1944, German: Kehraus) in 1944, the Serbian Volunteer Corps and a German regimental group Dizner (Дизнер) were mobilized in the Statovac (Upper and Lower) - Bučumet (Upper and Lower) line, together with other Axis forces, surrounded the Yugoslav Partisans which were situated in the Vidojevica mountain and Rgač mountain. This was the third phase of the Operation, codenamed Halali. The Partisans managed to extract the surrounded forces.

== Infrastructure ==
The rural settlement of Gornji Bučumet is of the "broken type" (Села разбијеног типа), with scattered residential structure. The village has 42,9% inhabitants dependent on agriculture (livestock-crop and viticulture).

There is a nearby gold mine, in Lece, located some kilometres west, where many inhabitants have worked in the past.

== Demographics ==
According to the 2002 census, the village had a population of 139 people, all of whom were ethnic Serbs. There were 119 adults, and the average life span was 47,3 years (44,7 in males, and 50,3 in females). There were 52 households, with average number of family members at 2,67.

Demographic history
Ethnic group	1948	1953	1961	1971	1981	1991	2002
Serbs							139 (100%)
Total	436	451	430	342	267	203	139

== See also ==
- Bučum, village in the municipality of Svrljig, Serbia
