= Niševac =

- Village
- Location within Serbia
- Coordinates: 43°27′31″N 22°05′57″E
- Country: Serbia
- District: Nišava District
- Municipality: Svrljig

Population (2002)
  - Total: 523
- Time zone: UTC+1 (CET)
  - Summer (DST): UTC+2 (CEST)

Niševac is a village in the municipality of Svrljig, Serbia. As of the 2022 census, the village had a population of 287 people.
