= Beloinje =

- Village
- Location within Serbia
- Coordinates: 43°23′27″N 22°09′56″E
- Country: Serbia
- District: Nišava District
- Municipality: Svrljig

Population (2002)
  - Total: 343
- Time zone: UTC+1 (CET)
  - Summer (DST): UTC+2 (CEST)

Beloinje is a village in Serbia, in the municipality of Svrljig in Nisava district. According to the census of 2002, there were 343 people (according to the census of 1991, there were 415 inhabitants).

== Demographics ==
In the village Beloinje live 297 adult inhabitants, and the average age is 49.8 years (47.3 for men and 52.2 for women). The village has 134 households, and the average number of occupants per household is 2.56. It is located near Svrljig, a city that is located in the southeastern part of Serbia, near Nis. This settlement is fully settled Serbs (according to the census of 2002) and in the last three censuses, there was a decline in population.
