= Varoš (Svrljig) =

Varoš Варош
- Village
- Location within Serbia
- Coordinates: 43°29′04″N 22°05′21″E
- Country: Serbia
- District: Nišava District
- Municipality: Svrljig

Population (2002)
  - Total: 168
- Time zone: UTC+1 (CET)
  - Summer (DST): UTC+2 (CEST)

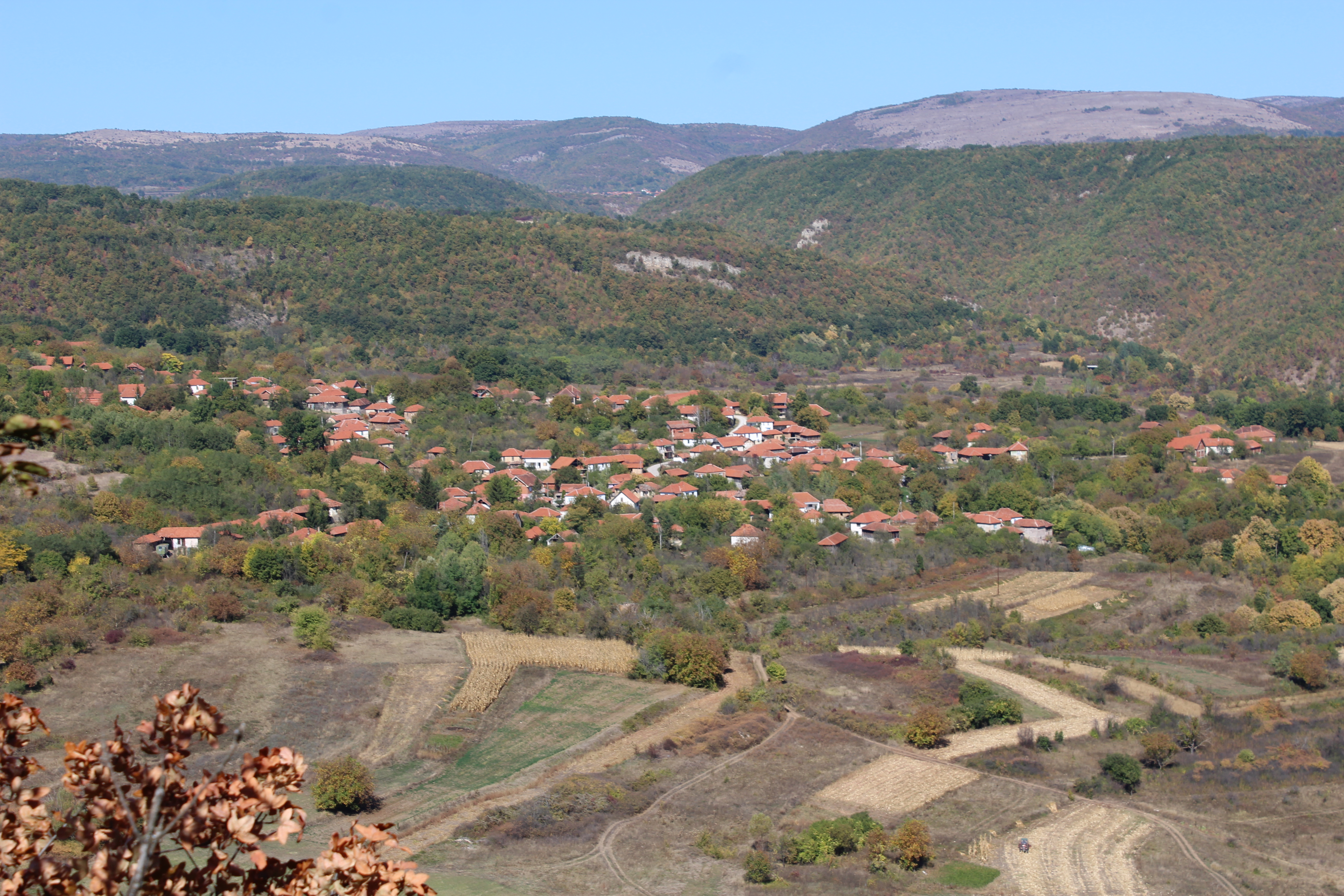
Varoš village

Varoš (Svrljig) is a village in the municipality of Svrljig, Serbia. According to the 2002 census, the village has a population of 168 people.
