= Crnoljevica =

- Location within Serbia
- Coordinates: 43°23′07″N 22°11′26″E
- Country: Serbia
- Region: Southern and Eastern Serbia
- District: Nišava
- Municipality: Svrljig
- Time zone: UTC+1 (CET)
  - Summer (DST): UTC+2 (CEST)

Crnoljevica (Serbian: Црнољевица) is a small village near the town Svrljig, in the Nišava District in eastern Serbia.
