= United Peasant Party =

Political party in Serbia

United Peasant Party Уједињена сељачка странка
- Abbreviation: USS
- President: Milija Miletić
- Founder: Milija Miletić; Dragoslav Avramović
- Founded: 15 February 2000; 26 years ago
- Headquarters: Radetova 48/C-4, Svrljig
- Youth wing: United Peasant Youth
- Ideology: Agrarianism
- Political position: Centre-right
- National affiliation: United Serbia
- European affiliation: European People's Party (cooperation)
- Colours: Green
- National Assembly: 1 / 250
- Assembly of Vojvodina: 0 / 120
- City Assembly of Belgrade: 0 / 110

Website
- www.uss.org.rs

The United Peasant Party (Serbian: Уједињена сељачка странка, romanised: Ujedinjena seljačka stranka, abbr. USS) is an agrarian political party in Serbia, led by Milija Miletić. Its primary area of strength is in the municipality of Svrljig. It is affiliated with the European People's Party in the Congress of Local and Regional Authorities. Since 2014, it has run on the electoral lists led by the Serbian Progressive Party (SNS), most recently on "Aleksandar Vučić – United Serbia" in the 2026 parliamentary election.

== History ==
According to the party's website, the United Peasant Party was established in Belgrade in 2000 via a merger of three small peasant parties. At the party's founding meeting, Dragoslav Avramović agreed to be its honorary president; he died the following year. The USS won representation in the Svrljig municipal assembly in the 2000 local elections, and local party leader Milija Miletić became mayor of the municipality in 2008.

The USS was not formally registered as a political party until 2010; prior to this time, it was designated as a Citizens' Group. Miletić was recognised as the party's leader at the time of its registration and has led it since. He is the only member of the USS to have served in the National Assembly, having been first elected in the 2014 election on the electoral list of SNS and re-elected on its lists in the 2016, 2020, 2022 and 2023 elections. In the 2026 snap election, he was 96th on the SNS-led "Aleksandar Vučić – United Serbia" list, which won 1,731,323 votes (39.48%) and 103 seats, losing the election to the Student List. Miletić was re-elected; his mandate was confirmed on 17 November 2026, and he joined the "Aleksandar Vučić – Serbia Wins" parliamentary group in the 15th National Assembly.

== Electoral performance ==
=== Parliamentary elections ===
National Assembly
Year	Leader	Popular vote	% of popular vote	#	# of seats	Seat change	Coalition	Status	Ref.
2012	Milija Miletić	Did not participate			0 / 250	0	–	Extra-parliamentary	–
2014	Milija Miletić	1,736,920	49.96%	▲1st	1 / 250	▲1	AV–BKV	Support	
2016	Milija Miletić	1,823,147	49.71%	1st	1 / 250	0	AV–SP	Support	
2020	Milija Miletić	1,953,998	63.02%	1st	1 / 250	0	AV–ZND	Support	
2022	Milija Miletić	1,635,101	44.27%	1st	1 / 250	0	AV–ZMS	Support	
2023	Milija Miletić	1,783,701	48.07%	1st	1 / 250	0	AV–SNSDS	Support	
2026	Milija Miletić	1,731,323	39.48%	▼2nd	1 / 250	0	AV–US	Opposition	
