= Tijovac (Svrljig) =

Tijovac Тијовац
- Village
- Location within Serbia
- Coordinates: 43°26′41″N 22°13′45″E
- Country: Serbia
- District: Nišava District
- Municipality: Svrljig

Population (2002)
  - Total: 118
- Time zone: UTC+1 (CET)
  - Summer (DST): UTC+2 (CEST)

Tijovac (Svrljig) is a village in the municipality of Svrljig, Serbia. According to the 2002 census, the village has a population of 118 people.
