= Svrljig Mountains =

Mountain in Serbia

- Location within Serbia

Highest point
- Elevation: 1,334 m (4,377 ft)
- Coordinates: 43°19′50″N 22°15′09″E

Geography
- Location: Eastern Serbia
- Parent range: Carpathian Mountains

Svrljig Mountains (Serbian Cyrillic: Сврљишке планине, Svrljiške planine) is a mountain in eastern Serbia, between towns of Svrljig at northwest and Bela Palanka at southeast. Its highest peak Zeleni vrh has an elevation of 1,334 meters above sea level. The peak Pleš (1,267 m) lies close to Niška Banja.

== See also ==
- List of mountains in Serbia
