= Svrljig =

Svrljig Сврљиг (Serbian)
- Town and municipality
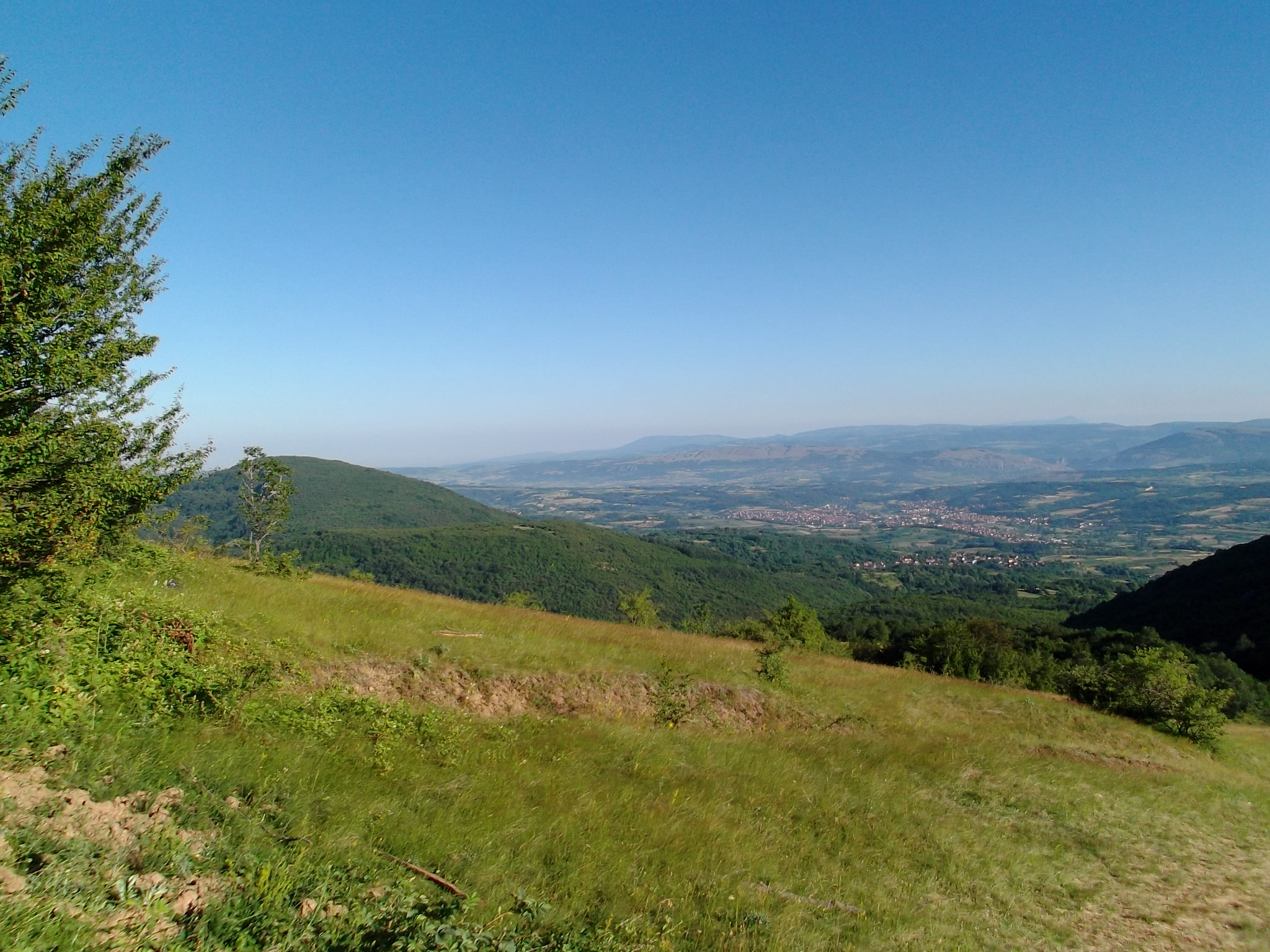

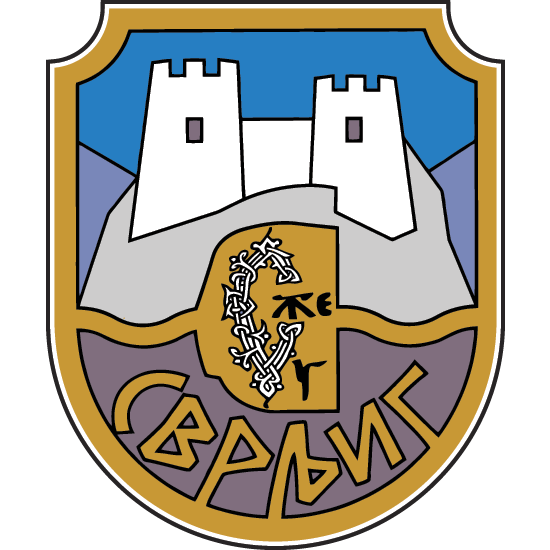
- Coat of arms

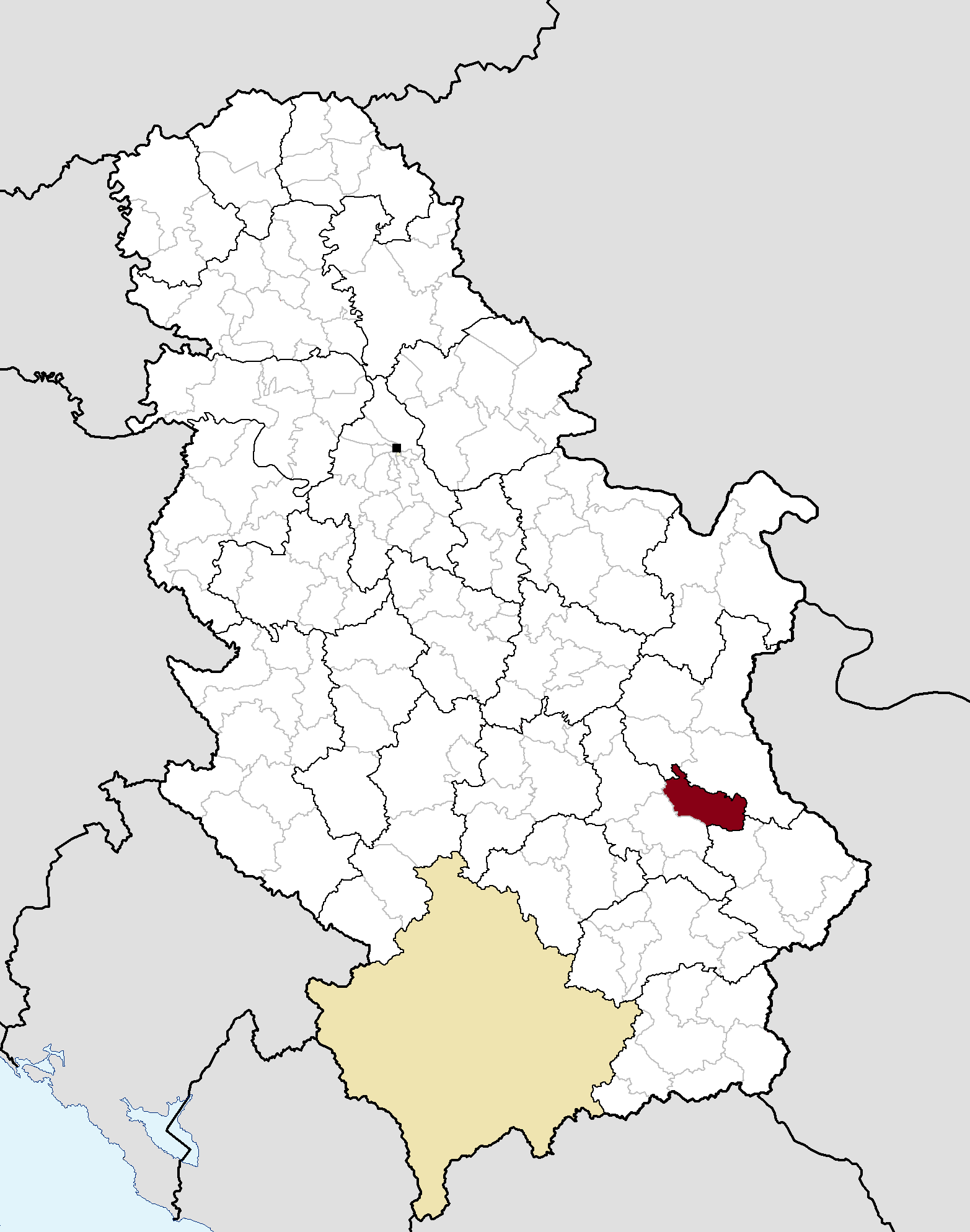
- Location of the municipality of Svrljig within Serbia
- Coordinates: 43°25′N 22°07′E
- Country: Serbia
- Region: Southern and Eastern Serbia
- District: Nišava
- Settlements: 39

Government
  - Mayor: Miroslav Marković (USS)

Area
  - Town: 4.64 km^{2} (1.79 sq mi)
  - Municipality: 497 km^{2} (192 sq mi)
- Elevation: 374 m (1,227 ft)

Population (2022 census)
  - Town: 6,762
  - Town density: 1,460/km^{2} (3,770/sq mi)
  - Municipality: 10,781
  - Municipality density: 21.7/km^{2} (56.2/sq mi)
- Time zone: UTC+1 (CET)
  - Summer (DST): UTC+2 (CEST)
- Postal code: 18360
- Area code: +381(0)18
- Car plates: NI
- Website: www.svrljig.rs

Svrljig (Serbian Cyrillic: Сврљиг, pronounced [sʋř̩ʎiːɡ]); until 1904 Derven (Serbian Cyrillic: Дервен) is a town and municipality located in the Nišava District of the southern Serbia. According to 2022 census, the town has a population of 6,762 inhabitants, while the municipality has 10,781.

== Geography ==
Svrljig is situated on the river Svrljiški Timok, 30 km east from Niš, the third largest city in Serbia. Nearby villages include Crnoljevica and Prekonoga.

== Settlements ==
Aside from the town of Svrljig, the municipality includes the following settlements:

- Beloinje
- Bučum
- Burdimo
- Crnoljevica
- Davidovac
- Drajinac
- Đurinac
- Galibabinac
- Gojmanovac
- Grbavče
- Gulijan
- Guševac
- Izvor
- Kopajkošara
- Labukovo
- Lalinac
- Lukovo
- Manojlica
- Mečji Do
- Merdželat
- Niševac
- Okolište
- Okruglica
- Palilula
- Periš
- Pirkovac
- Plužina
- Popšica
- Prekonoga
- Radmirovac
- Ribare
- Slivje
- Šljivovik
- Tijovac
- Varoš
- Vlahovo

== History ==
=== Anthropology ===
An anthropological study by Mihailo Kostić claimed that the Svrljig province was inhabited by mostly an "olden" population, while part descends from "colonists from the second half of the 15th century". According to Petar Vlahović, Svrljig is part of the Serbian Šopi ethnographical region.

=== Middle Ages ===
Svrljig was the name of a župa (county) in the Middle Ages. It is mentioned (for the first time) in the geographical list of counties and cities in the 1019–20 charters of Byzantine Emperor Basil II. The settlement and its surrounding region is mentioned as part of the Eparchy of Niš. In 1183, Svrljig and other nearby fortifications were taken over by Serbian Grand Prince Stefan Nemanja. The fortification mostly dates to the medieval Serbian period. It was situated on the road which connected Niš with the road to Constantinople. An evangelion manuscript written in Svrljig in the Serbian redaction of Old Slavic dating to 1279 is preserved in fragments. After the fall of Braničevo under the Serbian king Stefan Milutin in 1290s Svrljig became a border region. Svrljig was conquered and plundered in 1413 by Ottoman prince Musa Çelebi. It was then part of Stefan Lazarević's Serbian Despotate.

=== Early modern period ===
The town was known as Isferlik and Isfirlig in Ottoman Turkish. It was administratively part of the Sanjak of Vidin.

=== Modern ===
During the Toplica Uprising (1917), Serbian guerrilla bands were active in the region.

In 1922, the Niš–Svrljig–Knjaževac–Zaječar highway was built. From 1929 to 1941, Svrljig was part of the Morava Banovina of the Kingdom of Yugoslavia. During World War II, Yugoslav Partisans were active in the region.

== Demographics ==
Historical population
Year	Pop.	±% p.a.
1948	32,282	—
1953	32,939	+0.40%
1961	30,260	−1.05%
1971	26,505	−1.32%
1981	24,242	−0.89%
1991	20,740	−1.55%
2002	17,284	−1.64%
2011	14,249	−2.12%
2022	10,781	−2.50%

According to the 2011 census results, the municipality of Svrljig has 14,249 inhabitants.

=== Ethnic groups ===
The ethnic composition of the municipality is:

Ethnic group	Population	%
Serbs	13,843	97.15%
Roma	157	1.10%
Hungarians	9	0.06%
Macedonians	8	0.06%
Bulgarians	6	0.04%
Croats	6	0.04%
Others	220	1.54%
Total	14,249	

== Economy ==
The following table gives a preview of total number of employed people per their core activity (as of 2017):

Activity	Total
Agriculture, forestry and fishing	8
Mining	-
Processing industry	1,105
Distribution of power, gas and water	20
Distribution of water and water waste management	36
Construction	109
Wholesale and retail, repair	344
Traffic, storage and communication	88
Hotels and restaurants	73
Media and telecommunications	35
Finance and insurance	10
Property stock and charter	-
Professional, scientific, innovative and technical activities	54
Administrative and other services	12
Administration and social assurance	128
Education	172
Healthcare and social work	113
Art, leisure and recreation	4
Other services	28
Total	2,340

== See also ==
- Nišava District
- Subdivisions of Serbia
