= Nišava District =

Administrative district of Serbia

Nišava District Нишавски округ
- Administrative district of Serbia
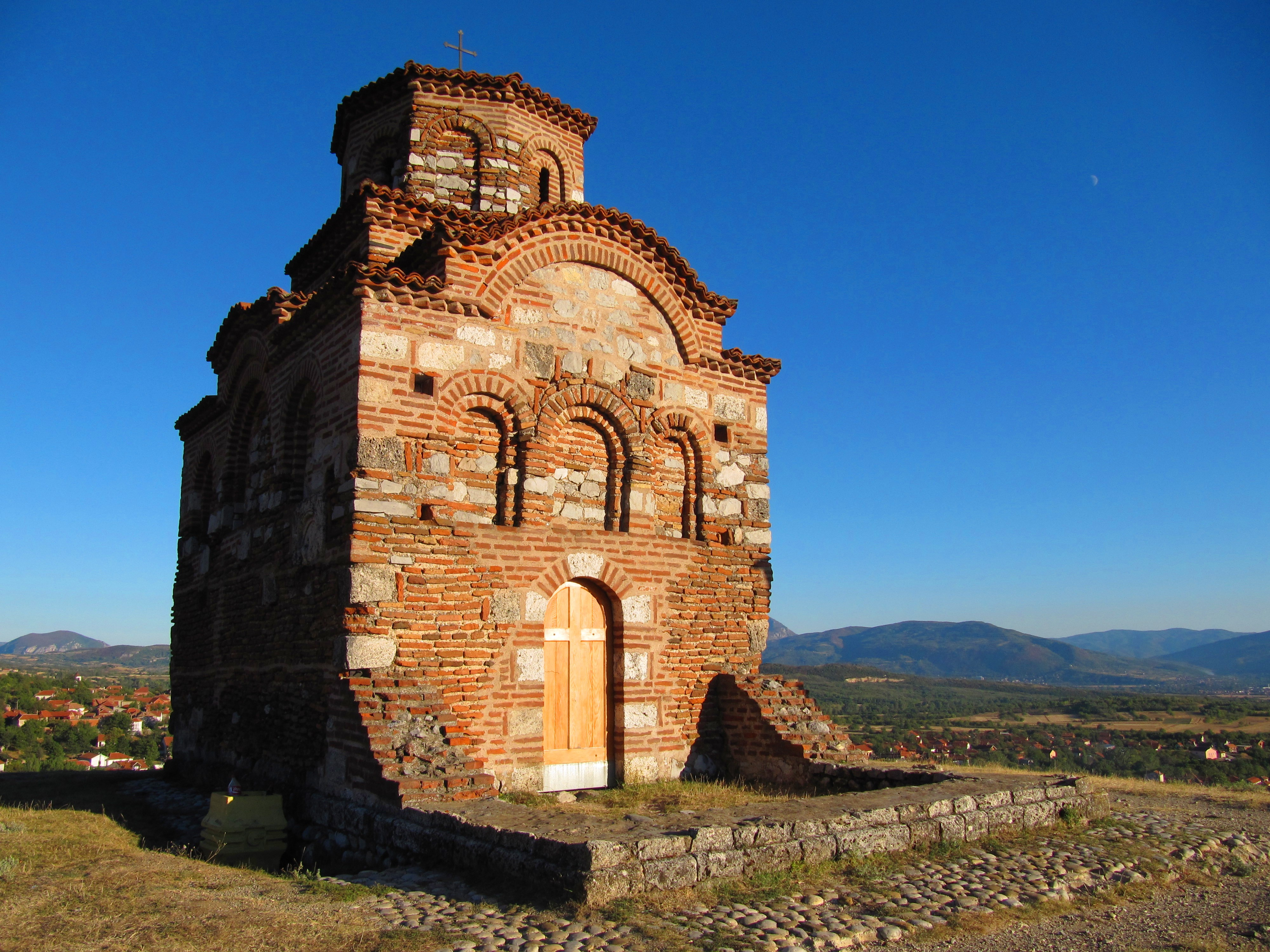
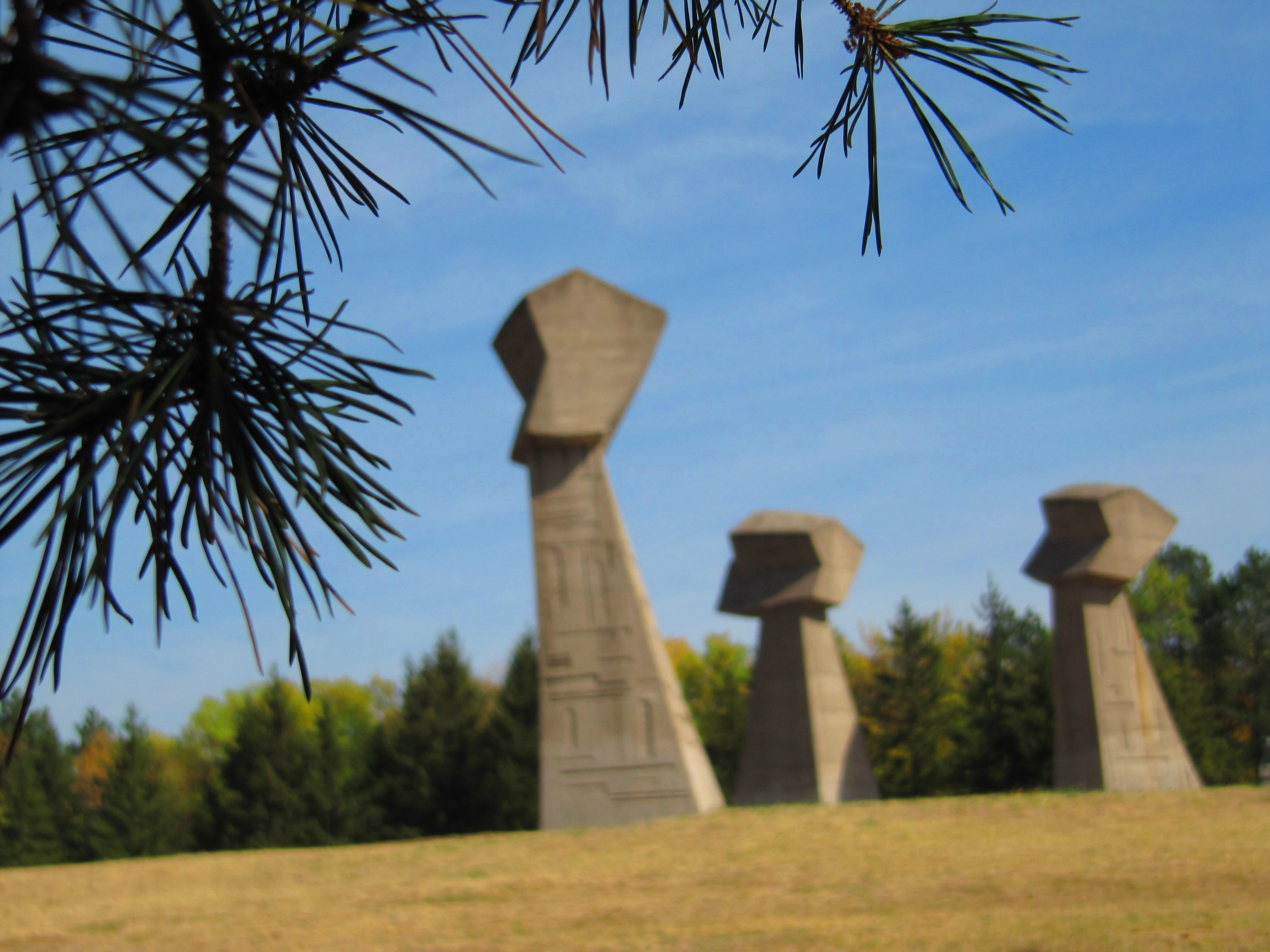
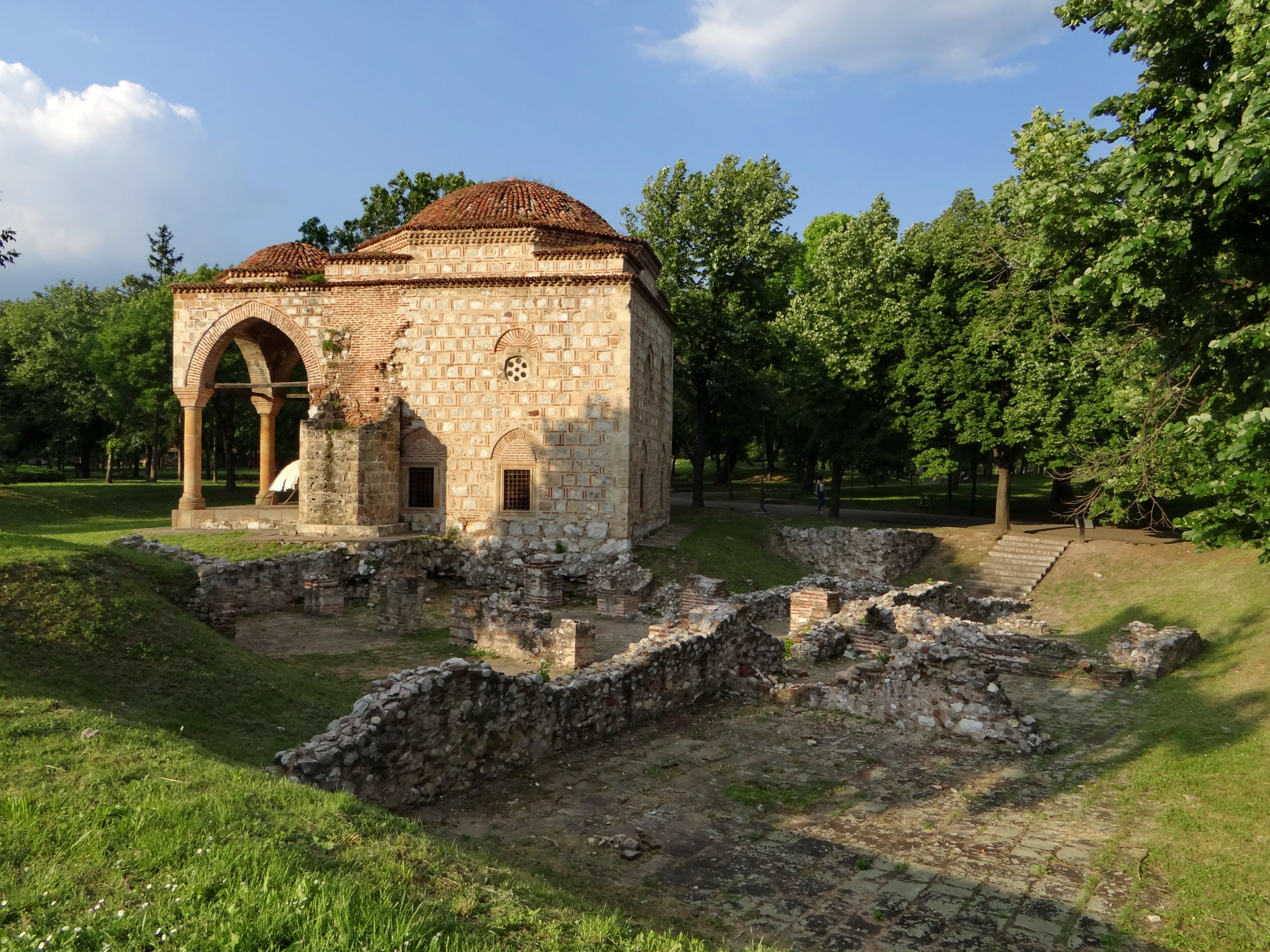
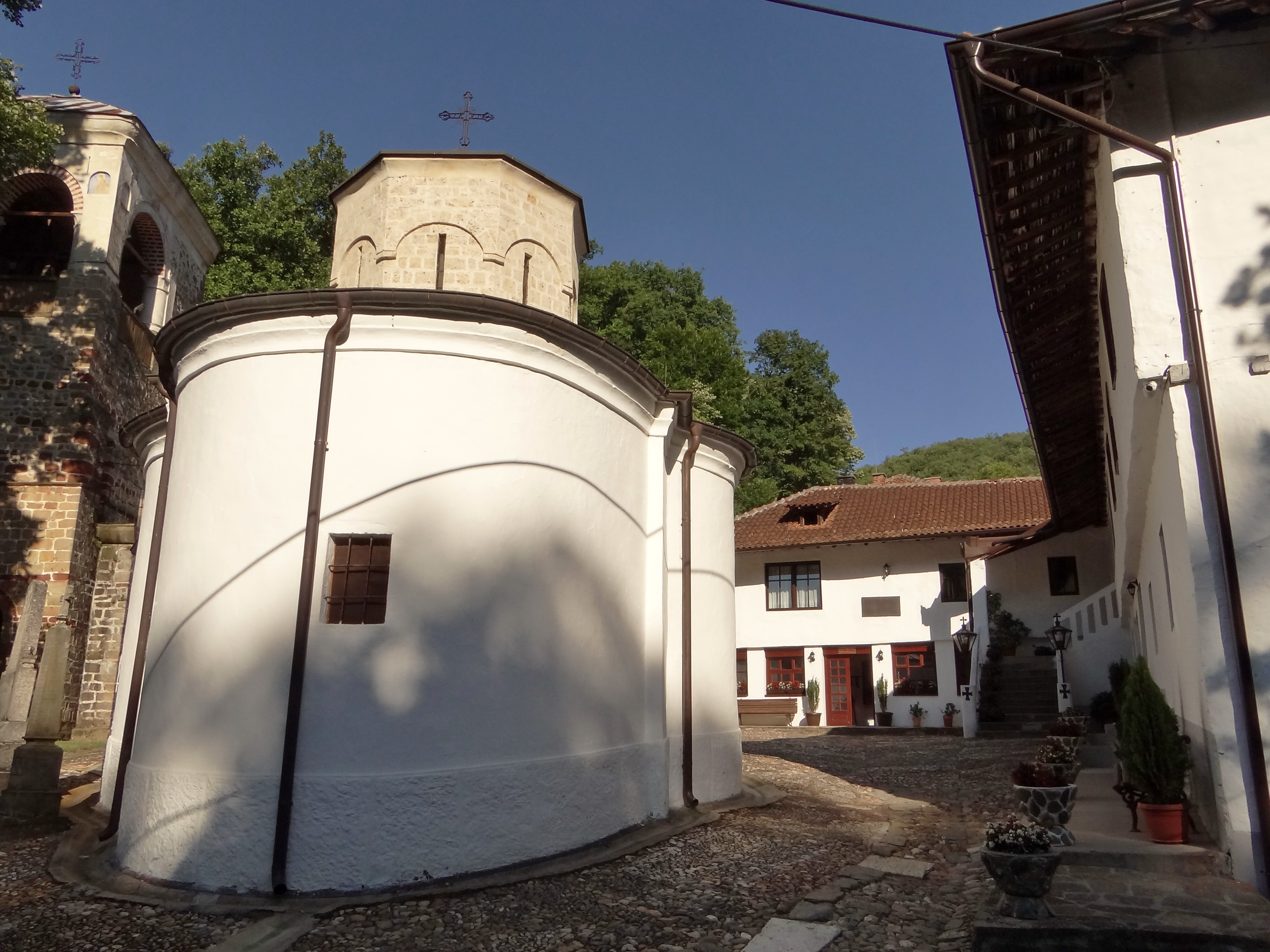
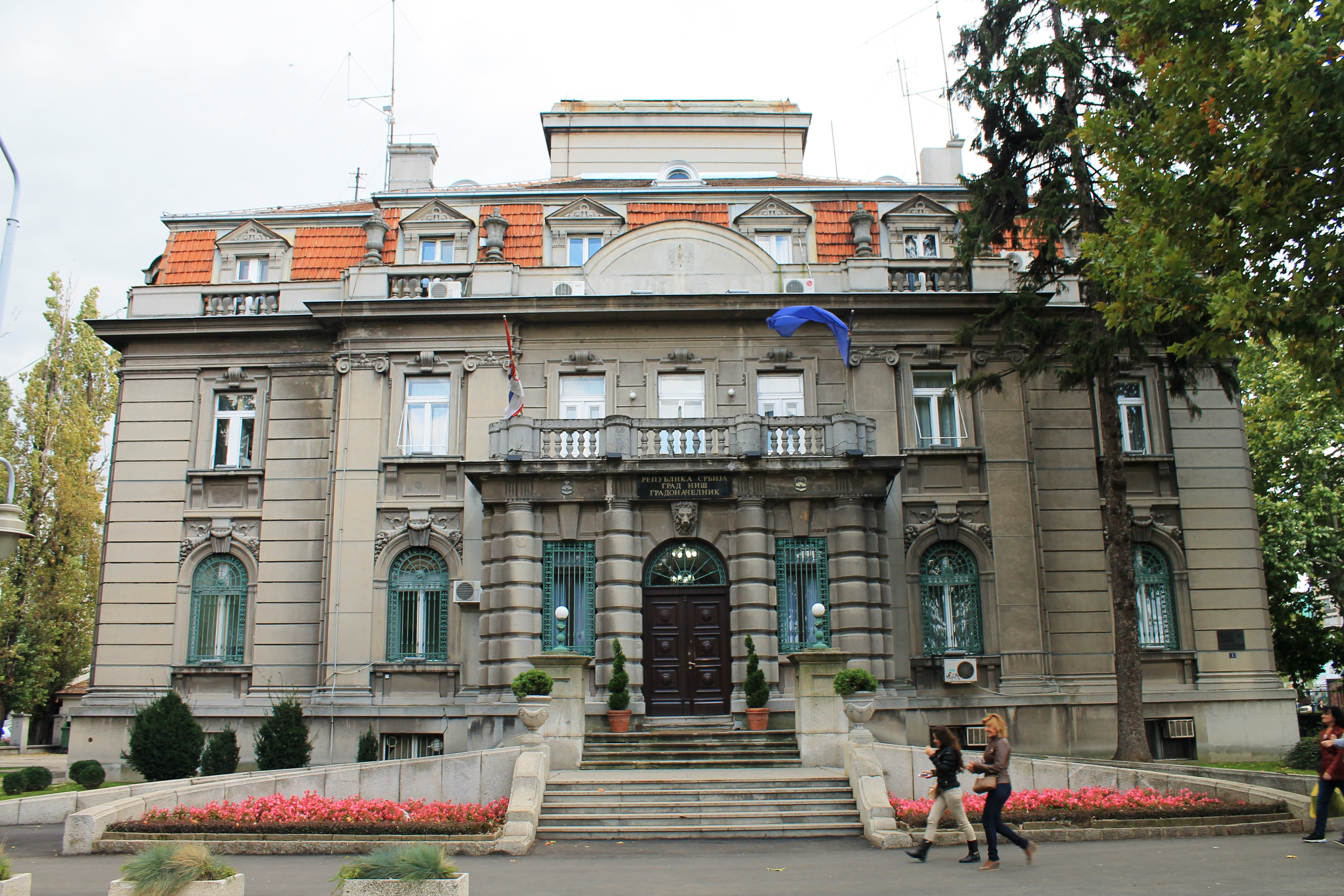
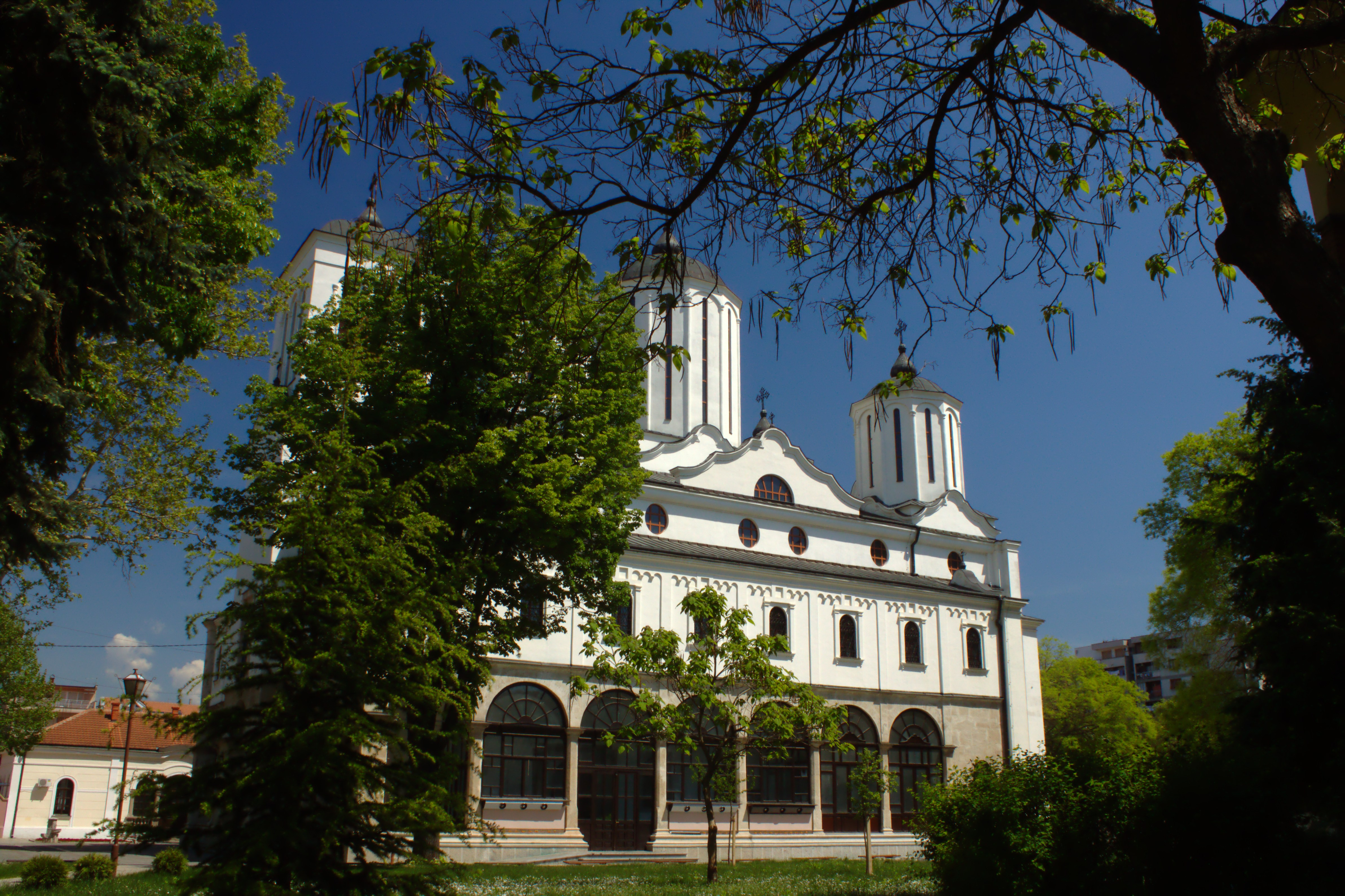
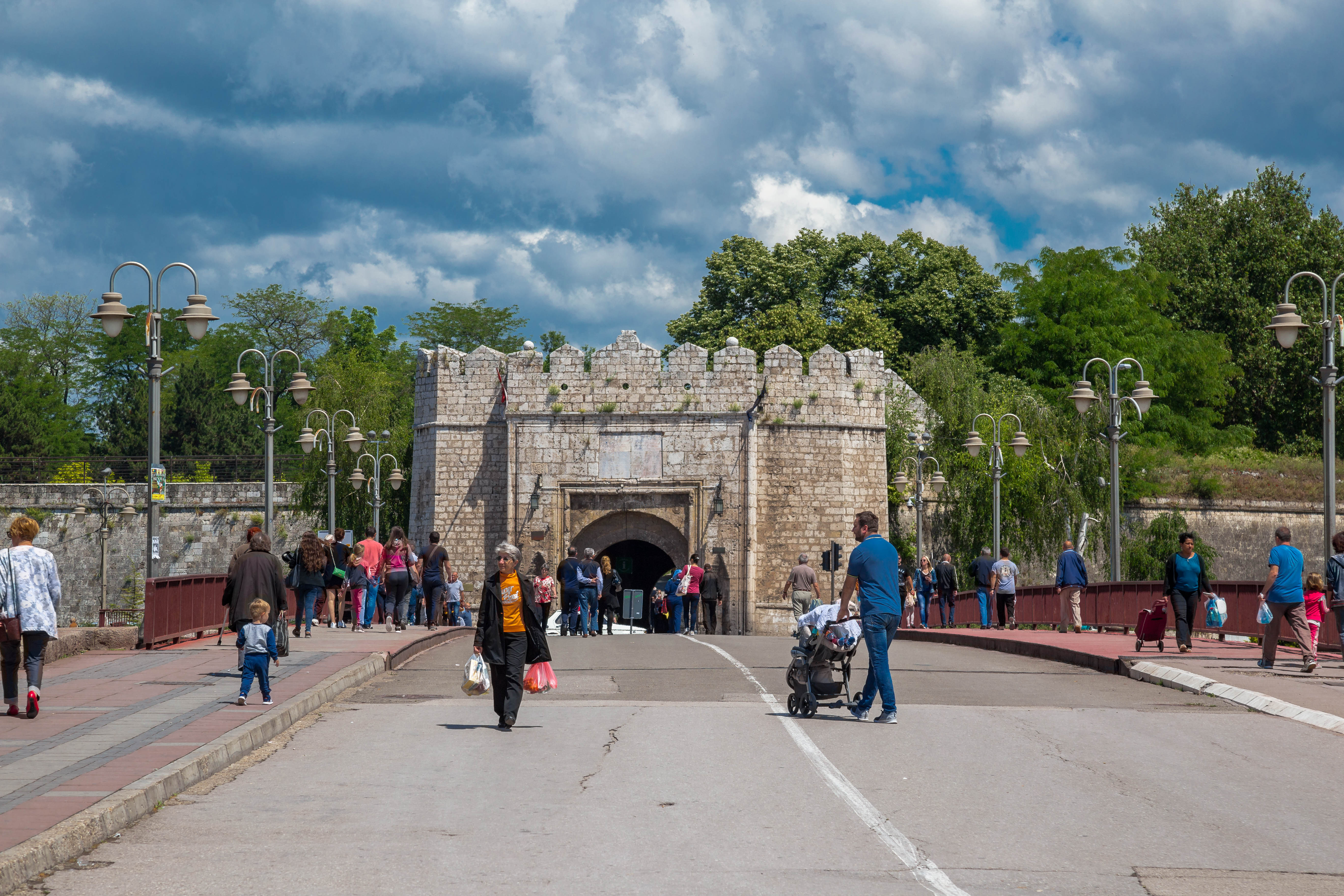
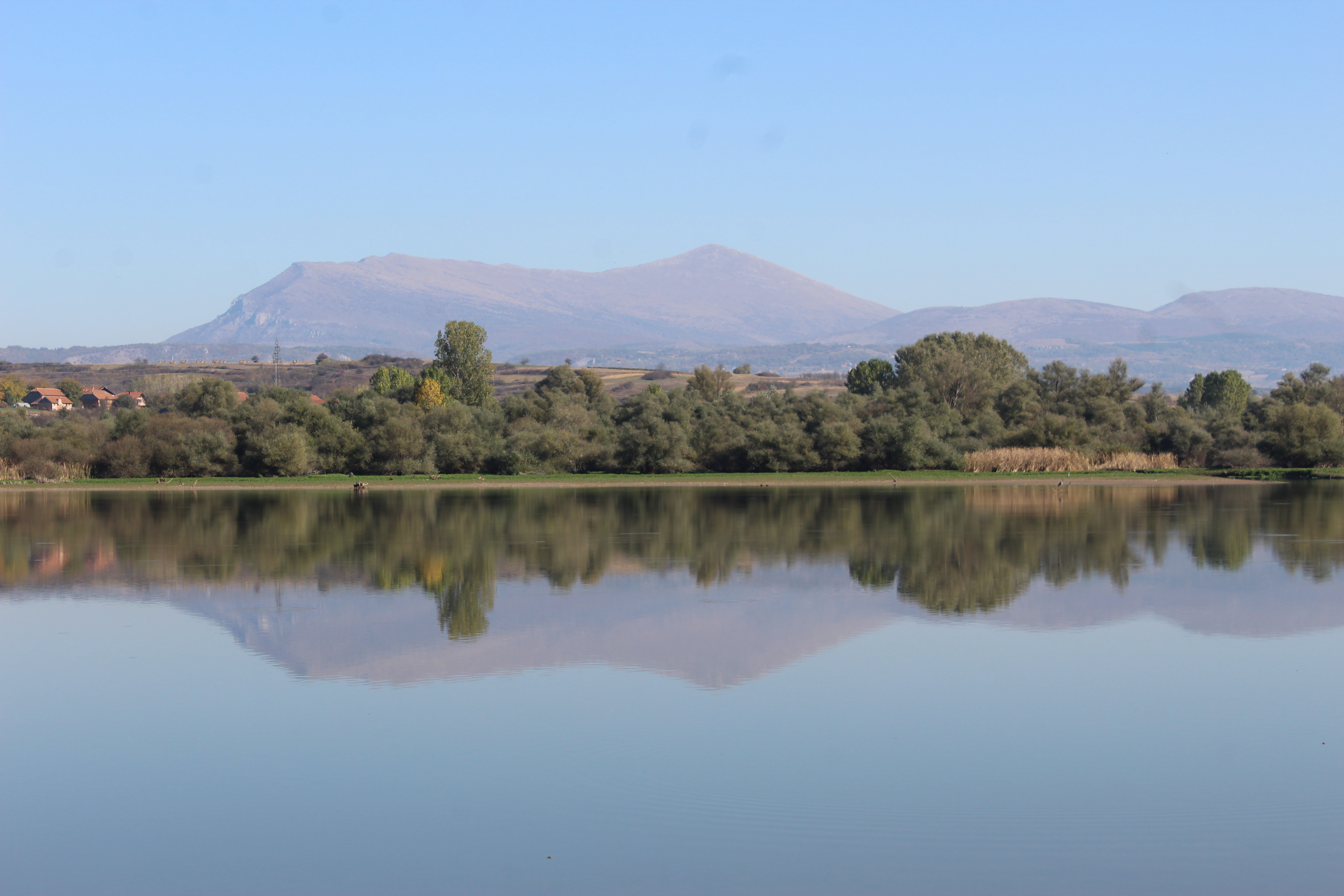
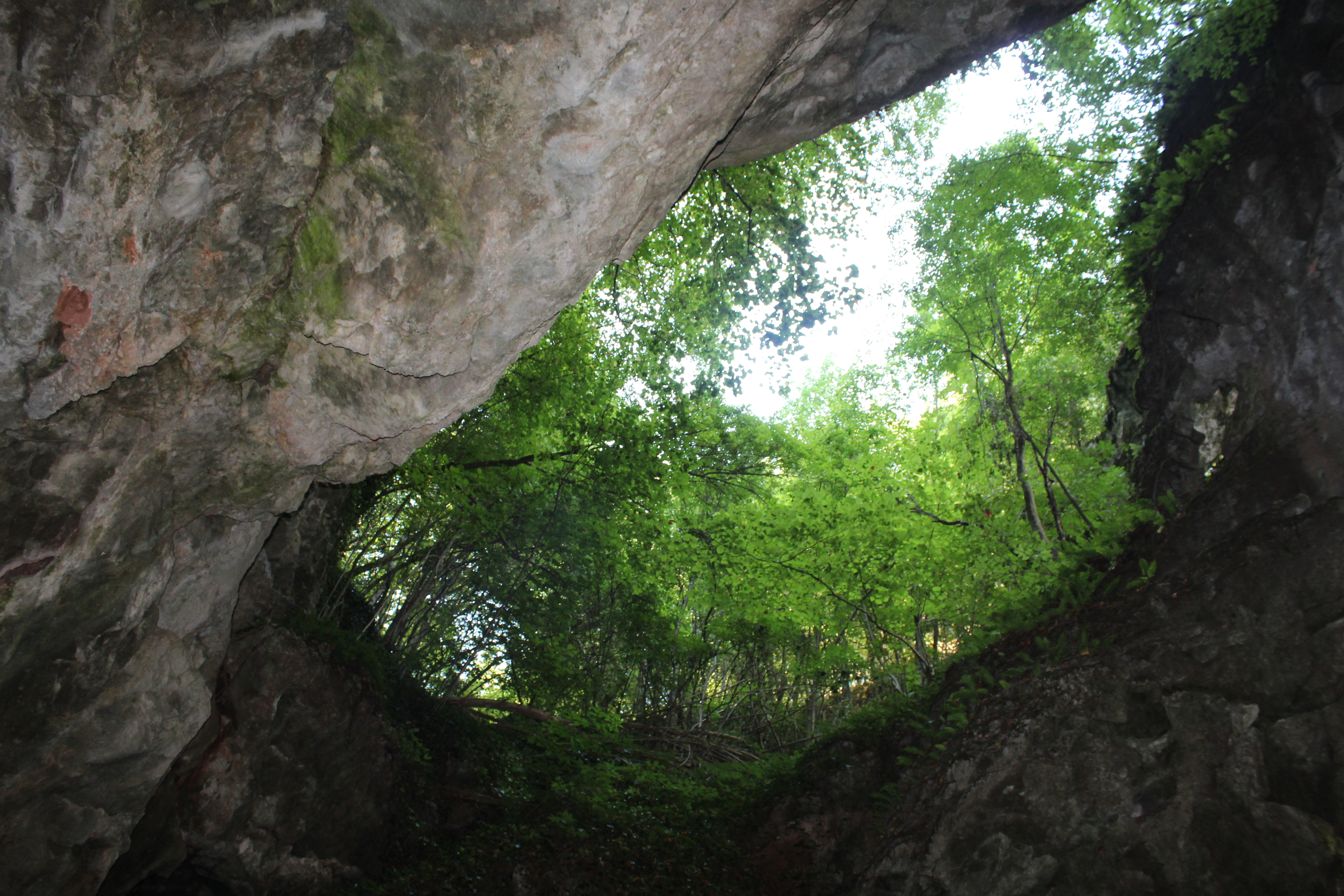
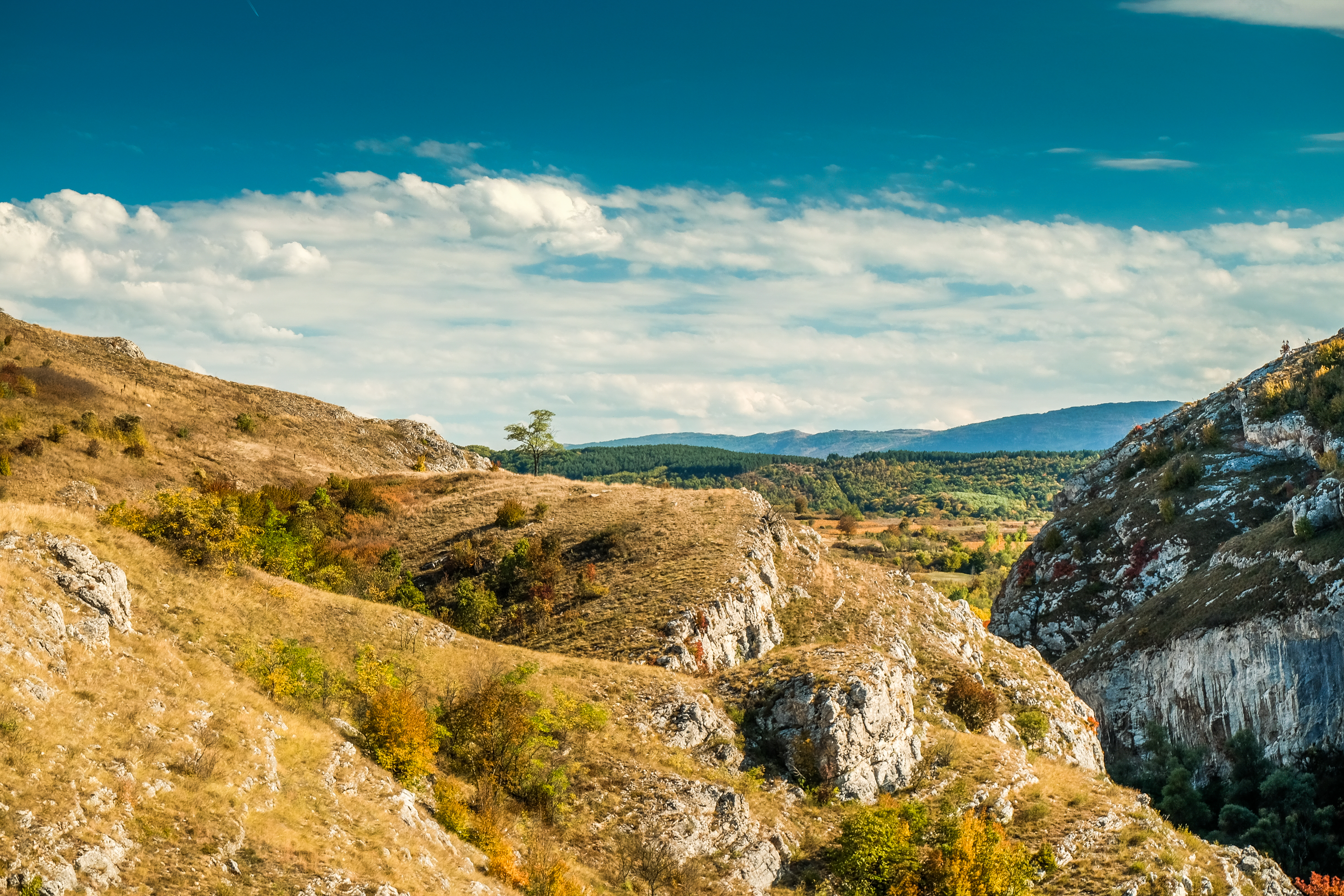
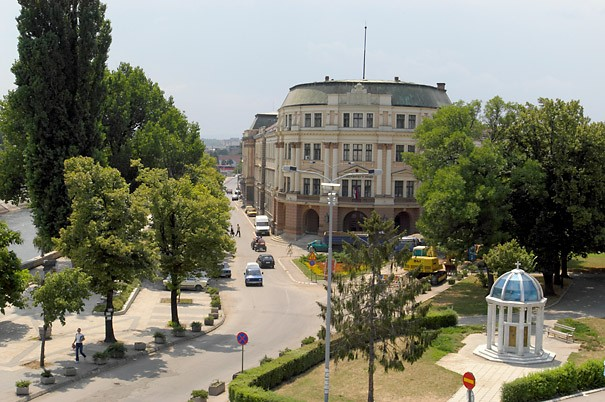
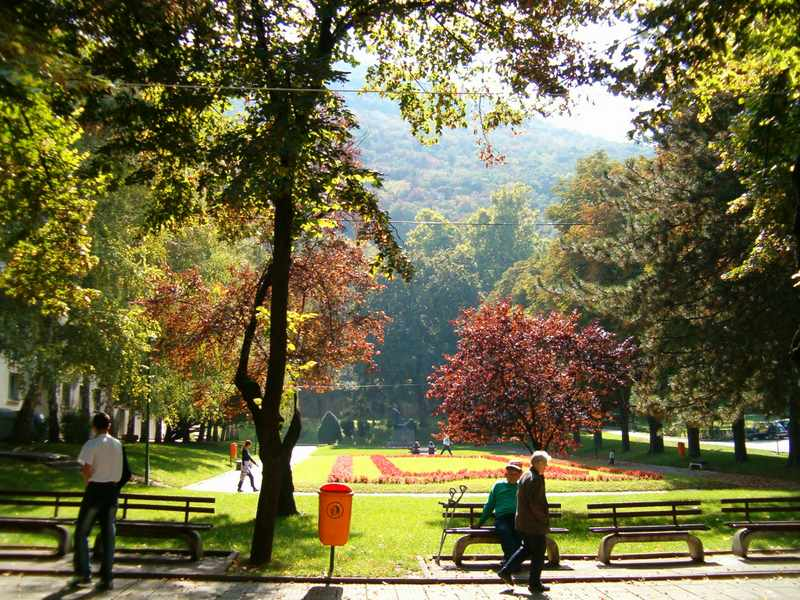
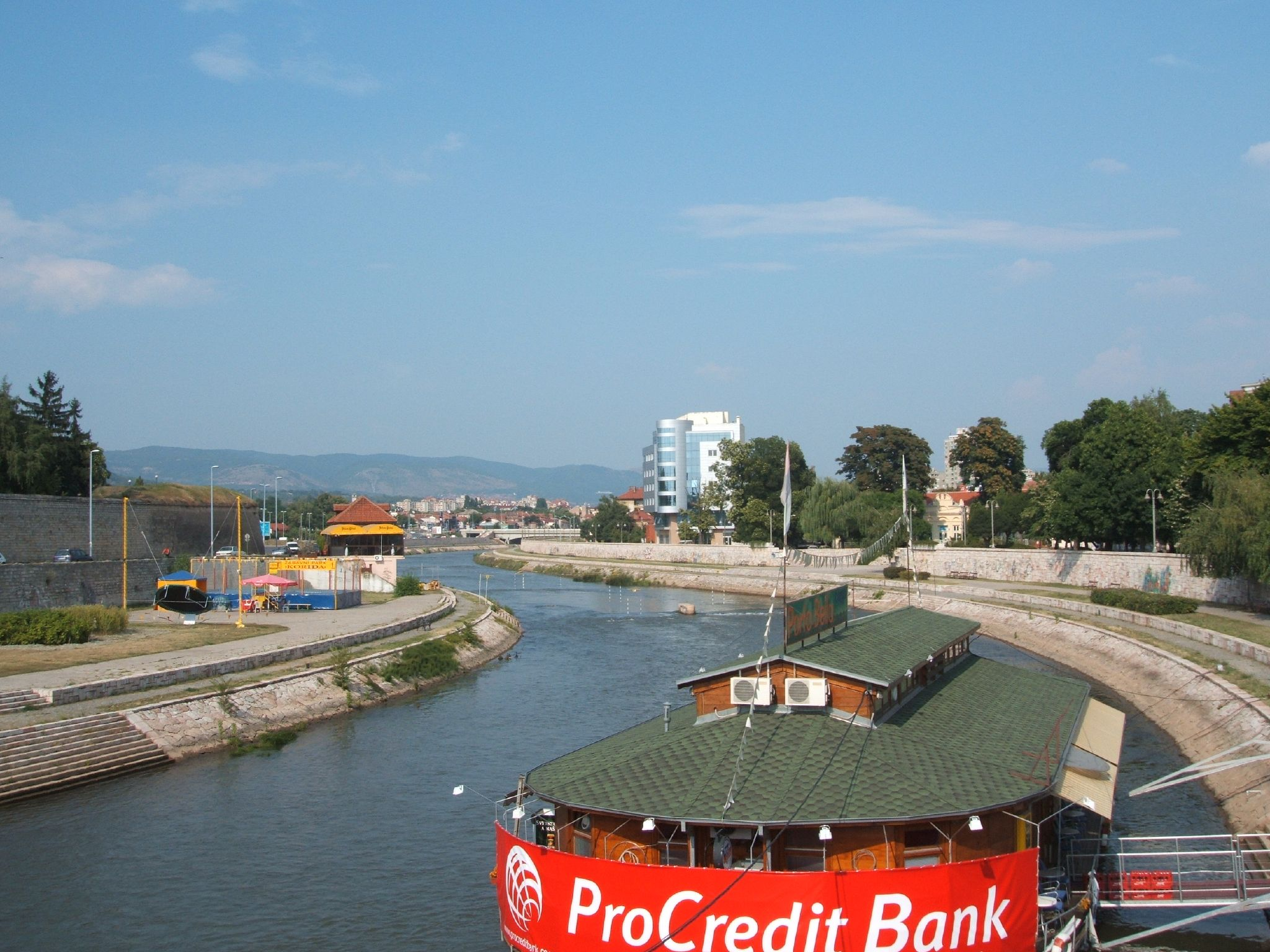
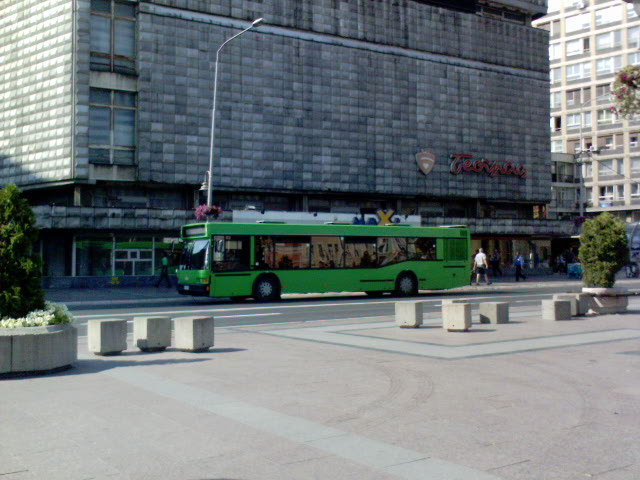
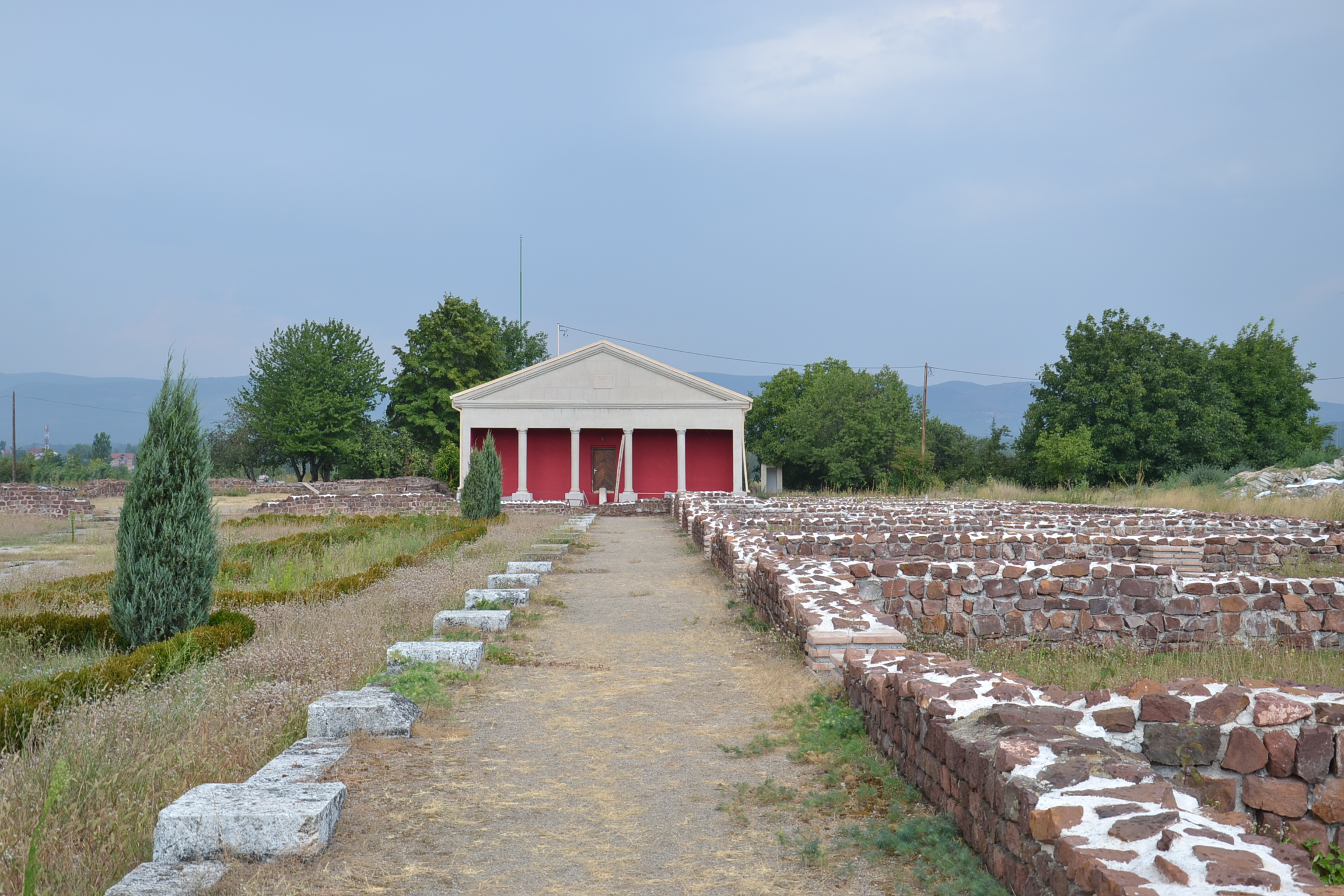
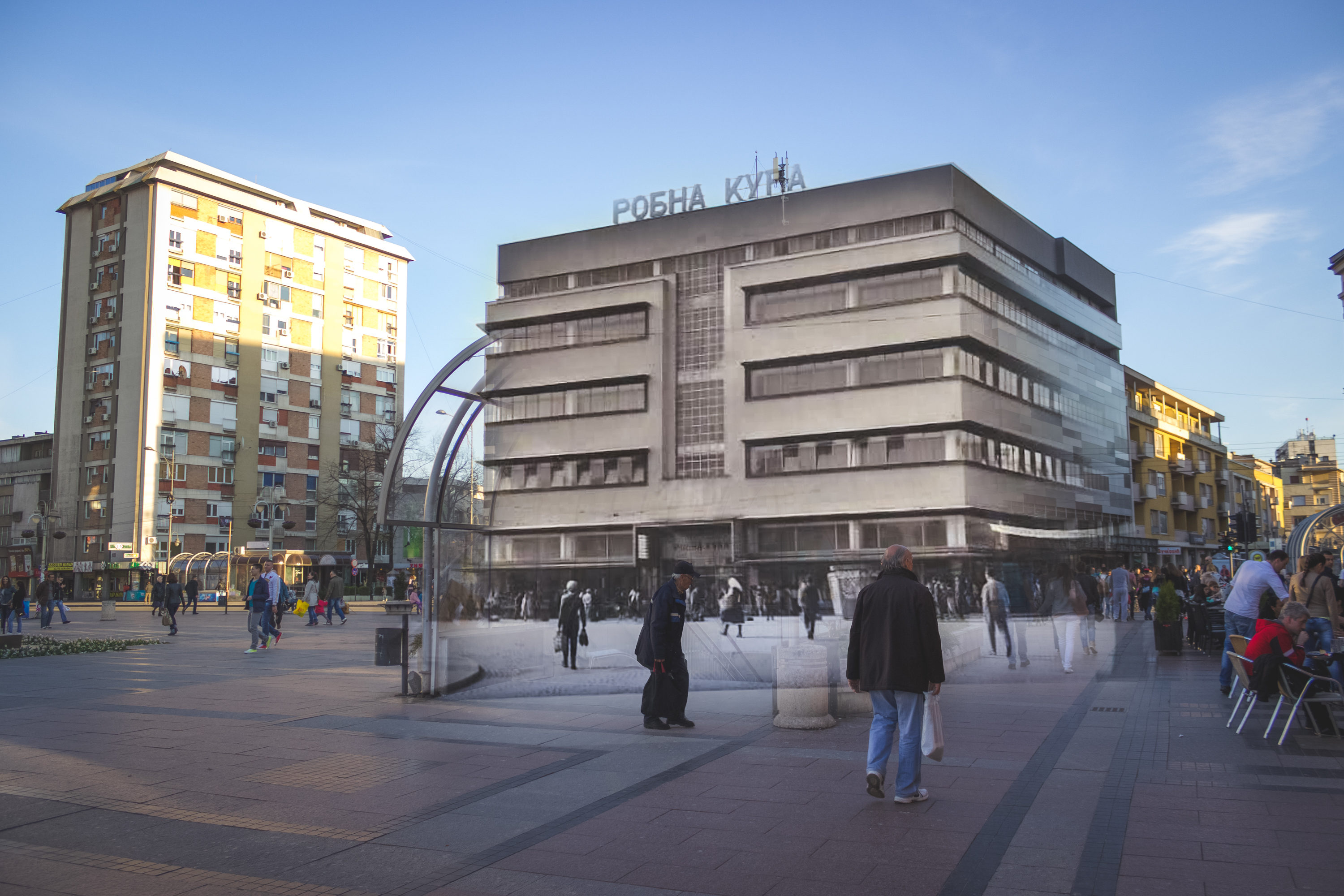
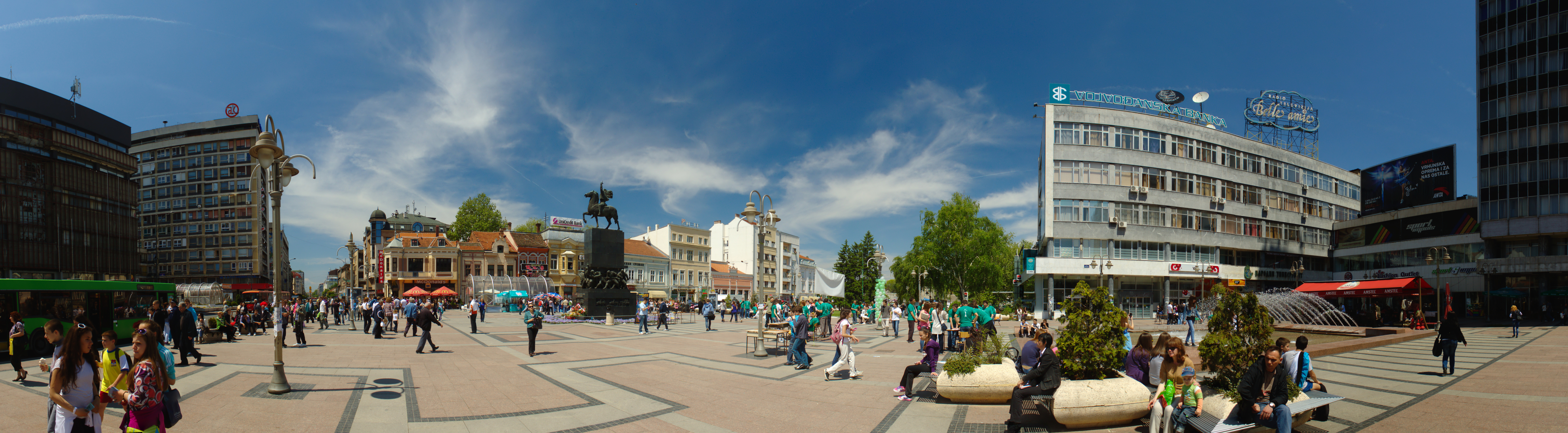
- Images from the Nišava District

- Location of district in Serbia
- Coordinates: 43°18′N 21°54′E
- Country: Serbia
- Administrative center: Niš

Government
  - Commissioner: Petar Babović

Area
  - Total: 2,729 km^{2} (1,054 sq mi)

Population (2022)
  - Total: 343,950
  - Density: 126.0/km^{2} (326.4/sq mi)
- ISO 3166 code: RS-20
- Municipalities: 6 and 1 city
- Settlements: 285
- Cities and towns: 8
- Villages: 277
- Website: nis.okrug.gov.rs

The Nišava District (Serbian: Нишавски округ, romanized: Nišavski okrug, pronounced [nîʃaʋskiː ôkruːɡ]) is one of administrative districts of Serbia. It lies in the southeastern parts of Serbia. According to the 2022 census, it has a population of 343,950 inhabitants. The administrative center of the district is the city of Niš. After South Bačka District, it is the second largest District in Serbia.

== Cities and municipalities ==
The Nišava District encompasses one city and eight municipalities:

- Niš (city)
- Aleksinac (municipality)
- Doljevac (municipality)
- Gadžin Han (municipality)
- Merošina (municipality)
- Ražanj (municipality)
- Svrljig (municipality)

The City of Niš is divided into municipalities of: Medijana, Niška Banja, Palilula, Pantelej, and Crveni Krst.

== Demographics ==
Historical population
Year	Pop.	±%
1948	283,842	—
1953	303,482	+6.9%
1961	327,367	+7.9%
1971	363,292	+11.0%
1981	394,110	+8.5%
1991	396,043	+0.5%
2002	381,757	−3.6%
2011	376,319	−1.4%
2022	343,950	−8.6%

=== Cities and towns ===
There are two cities/towns with over 10,000 inhabitants:

- Niš: 178,976
- Aleksinac: 14,593

=== Ethnic structure ===
Ethnicity	Population	Share
Serbs	311,039	90.4%
Roma	9,760	2.8%
Others	4,203	1.2%
Undeclared/Unknown	18,948	5.5%

== See also ==
- Administrative districts of Serbia
- Administrative divisions of Serbia
