= Mađere =

Mađere may refer to:

- Mađere (Prokuplje)
- Mađere (Ražanj)
