= Maletina =

- Village
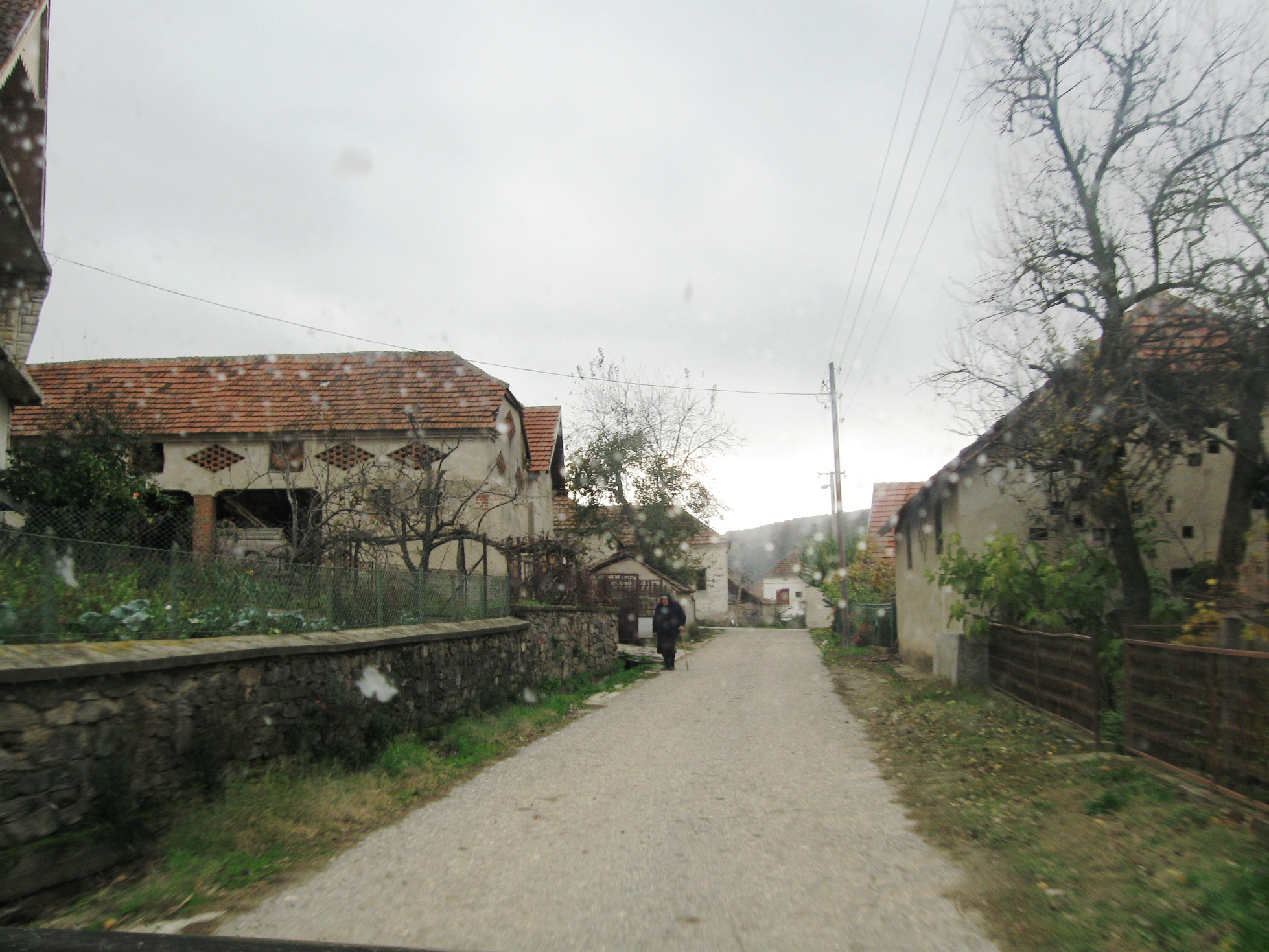

- Location within Serbia
- Coordinates: 43°36′59″N 21°29′53″E
- Country: Serbia
- District: Nišava District
- Municipality: Ražanj

Population (2002)
  - Total: 188
- Time zone: UTC+1 (CET)
  - Summer (DST): UTC+2 (CEST)

Maletina is a village in the municipality of Ražanj, Serbia. According to the 2002 census, the village has a population of 188 people. Near the village are the ruins of a medieval fortress ( Fort Maletina ), which probably belonged to the defense system stalaćke fortress.

== Demographics ==
In the village Maletina there are 165 adult inhabitants, and the average age is 51.8 years (51.6 for men and 51.9 for women). The village has 60 households, and the average number of people per household is 3.13. There are 11 minors in the village.
