= Pretrkovac =

- Village
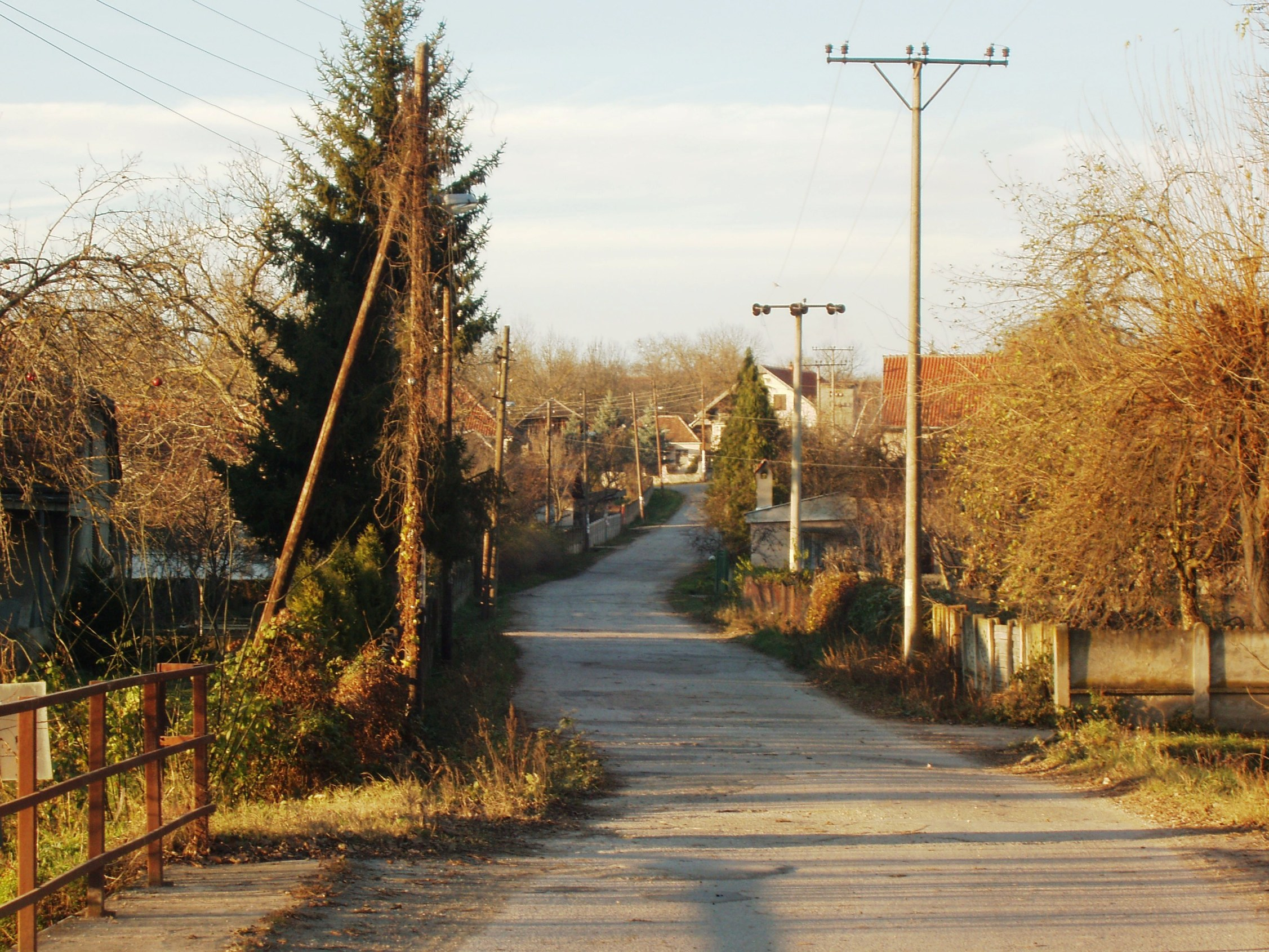

- Location within Serbia
- Coordinates: 43°45′41″N 21°31′59″E
- Country: Serbia
- District: Nišava District
- Municipality: Ražanj

Population (2002)
  - Total: 326
- Time zone: UTC+1 (CET)
  - Summer (DST): UTC+2 (CEST)

Pretrkovac is a village in the municipality of Ražanj, Serbia. According to the 2002 census, the village has a population of 326 people.
