= Čubura (Ražanj) =

Čubura Чубура
- Village
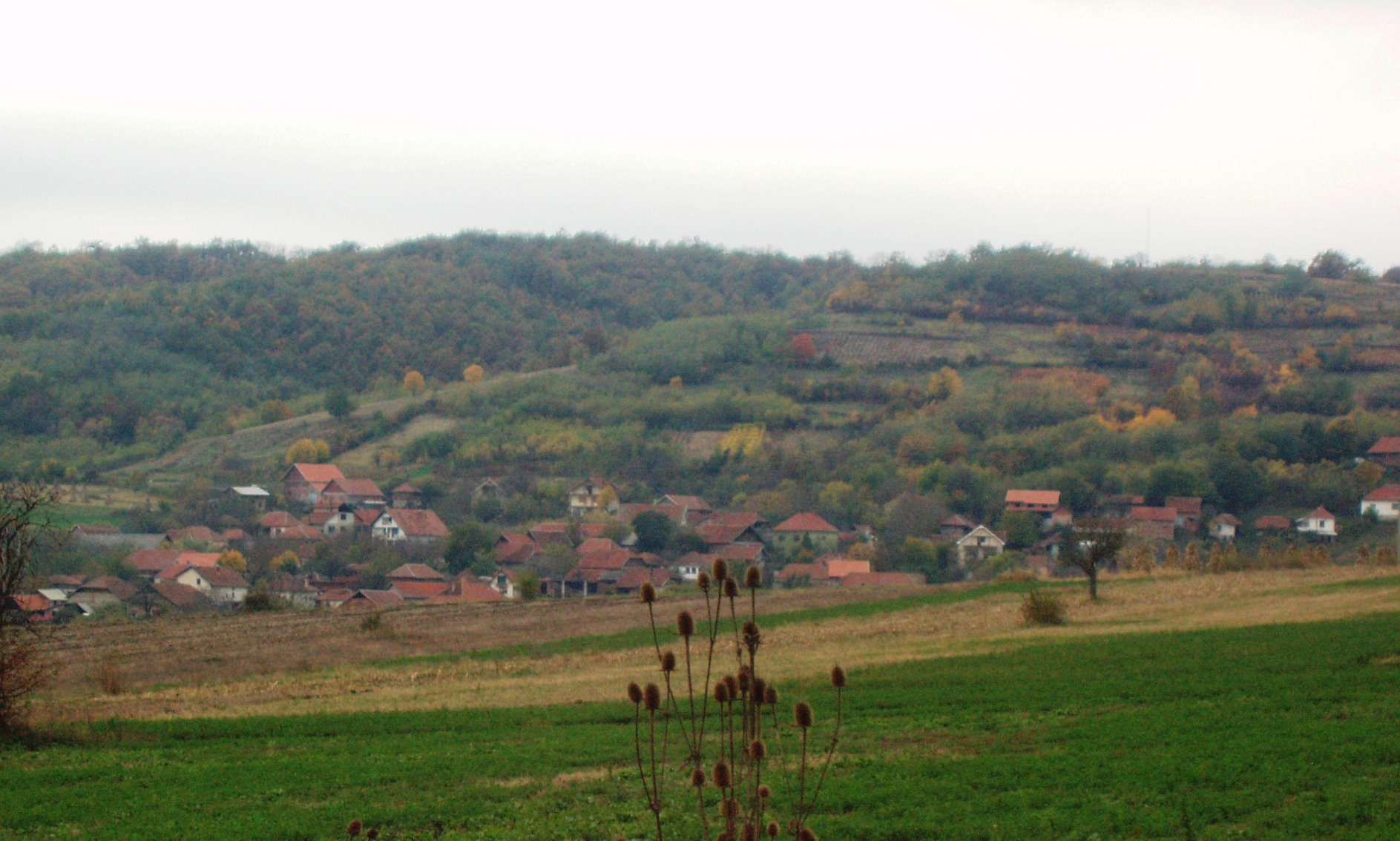

- Location within Serbia
- Coordinates: 43°40′01″N 21°32′05″E
- Country: Serbia
- District: Nišava District
- Municipality: Ražanj

Population (2002)
  - Total: 194
- Time zone: UTC+1 (CET)
  - Summer (DST): UTC+2 (CEST)

Čubura is a village in the municipality of Ražanj, Serbia. According to the 2002 census, the village has a population of 194 people.
