= Vitoševac =

- Village
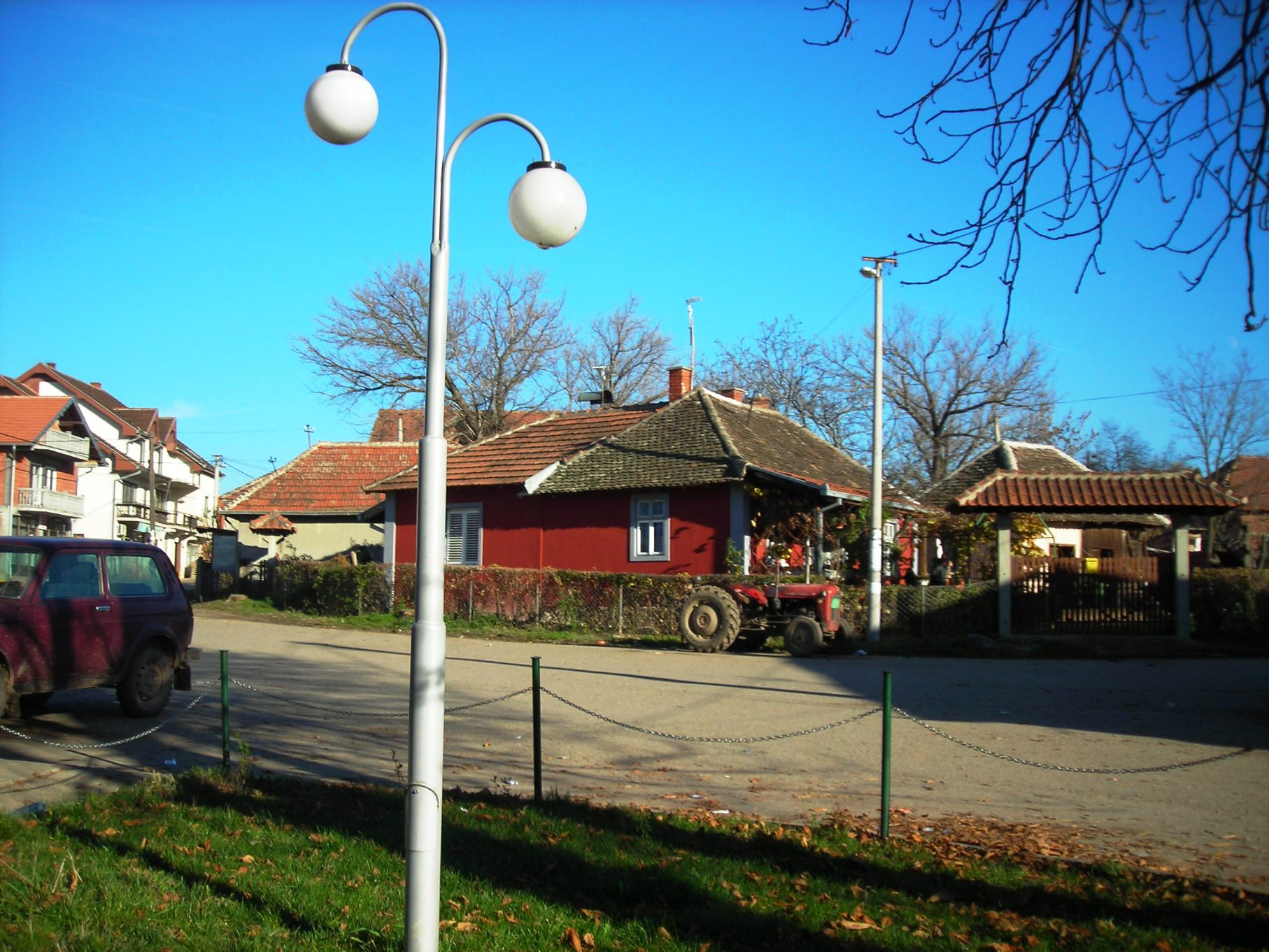
- Vitoševac Centre

- Location within Serbia
- Coordinates: 43°44′35″N 21°34′46″E
- Country: Serbia
- District: Nišava District
- Municipality: Ražanj

Population (2002)
  - Total: 1,277
- Time zone: UTC+1 (CET)
  - Summer (DST): UTC+2 (CEST)

Vitoševac is a village in the municipality of Ražanj, Serbia. According to the 2002 census, the village had a population of 1277 people.
