= Varoš (Ražanj) =

Varoš Варош
- Village
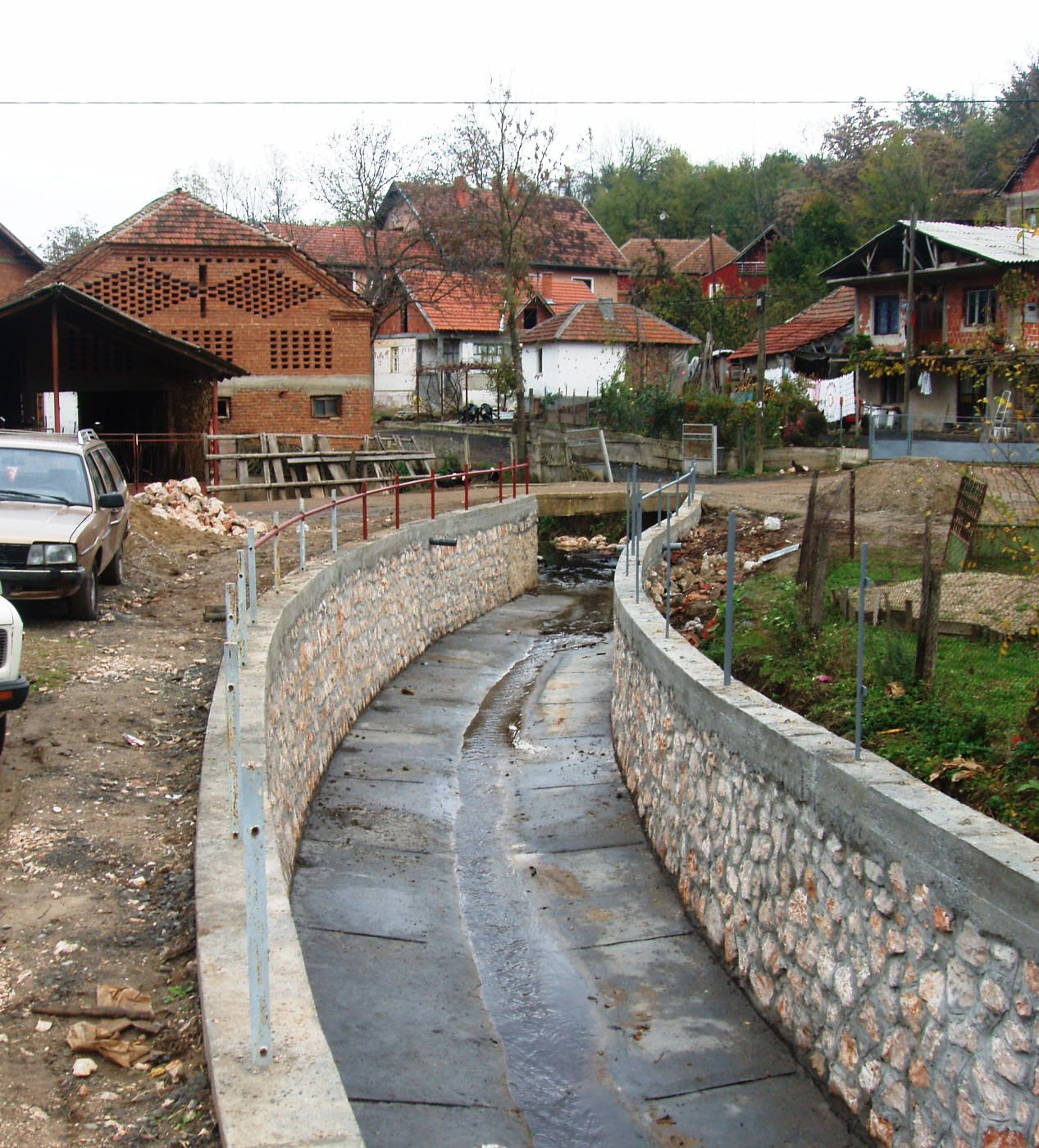

- Location within Serbia
- Coordinates: 43°41′01″N 21°33′28″E
- Country: Serbia
- District: Nišava District
- Municipality: Ražanj

Population (2002)
  - Total: 360
- Time zone: UTC+1 (CET)
  - Summer (DST): UTC+2 (CEST)

Varoš is a village in the municipality of Ražanj, Serbia. According to the 2011 census there are 316 adult inhabitants, and the average age is 48.7 years (46.6 for men and 50.5 for women). The village has 104 households, and the average number of household members is 3.46. .
