= Mađere (Ražanj) =

Mađere Мађере
- Village
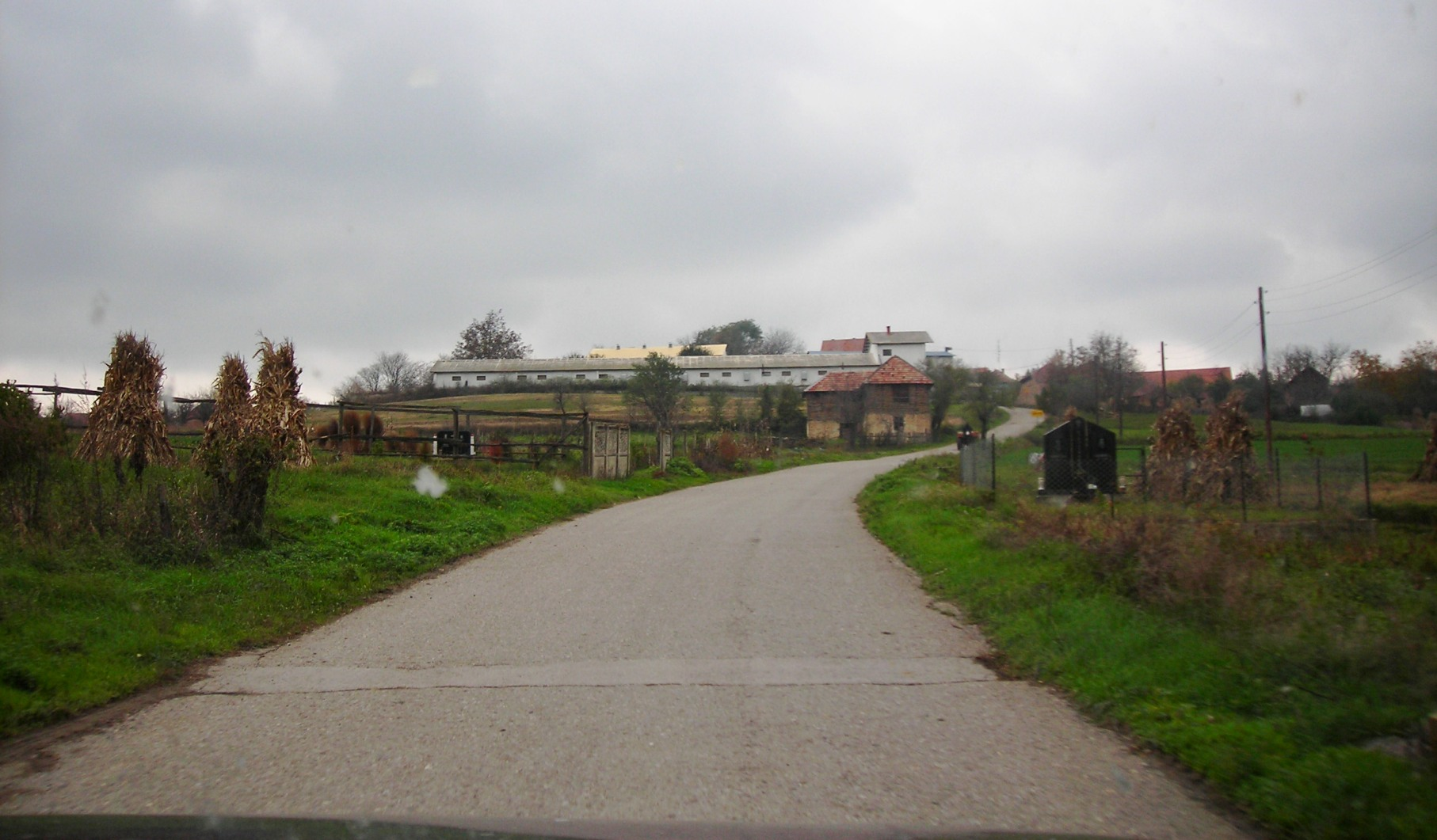

- Location within Serbia
- Coordinates: 43°41′48″N 21°30′56″E
- Country: Serbia
- District: Nišava District
- Municipality: Ražanj

Population (2002)
  - Total: 525
- Time zone: UTC+1 (CET)
  - Summer (DST): UTC+2 (CEST)

Mađere is a village located in the municipality of Ražanj, in Serbia. As per the 2002 census, the population of the village was 525 people.

== Demographics ==
Mađere has a total of 438 adult inhabitants, with an average age of 47.0 years (45.4 for men and 48.7 for women). The village comprises 167 households, with an average of 3.14 members per household. The village is predominantly populated by Serbs, according to the 2002 census. However, there has been a decline in population in the last three censuses.
