= Ražanj =

Ražanj Ражањ (Serbian)
- Village and municipality
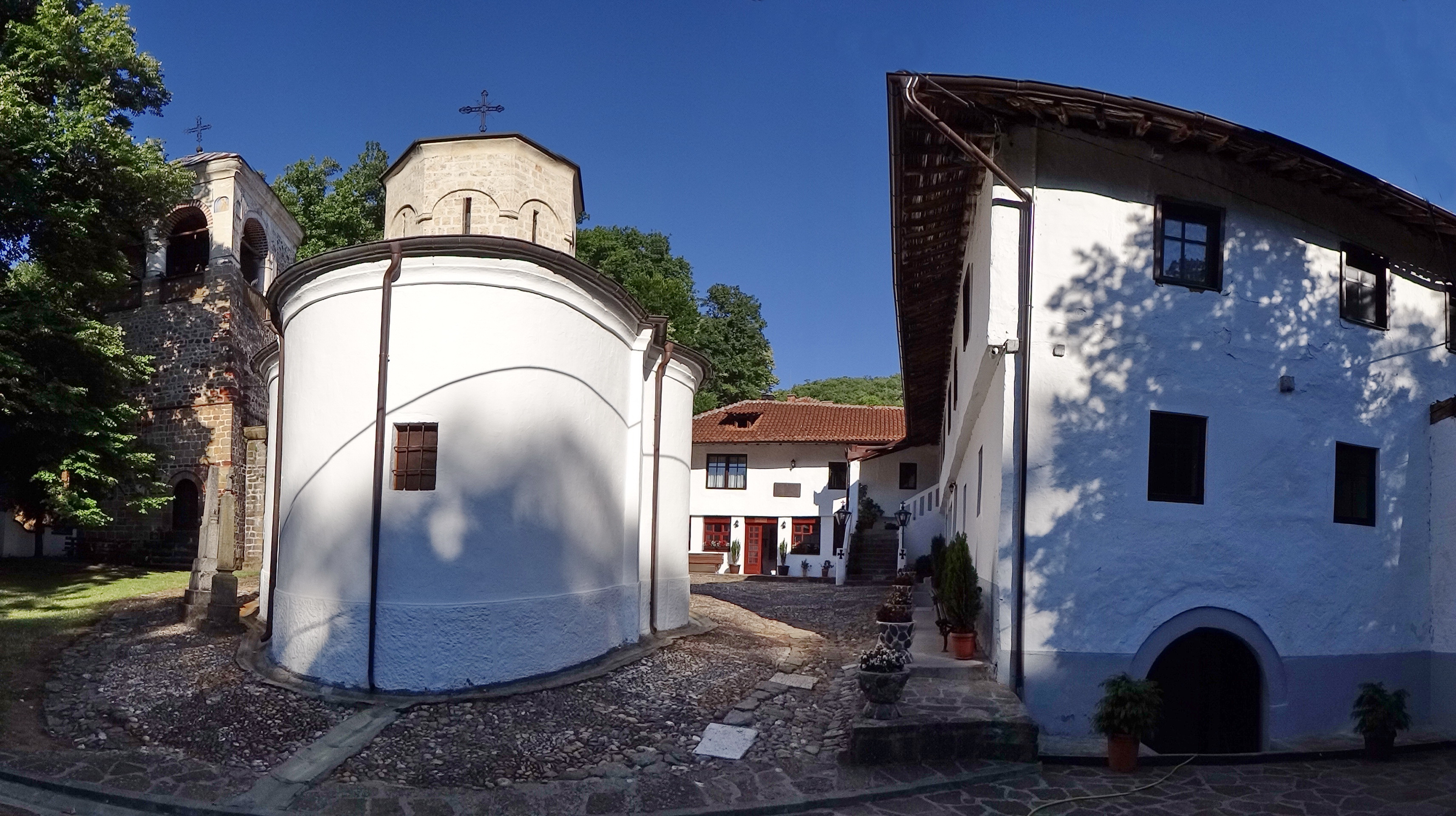
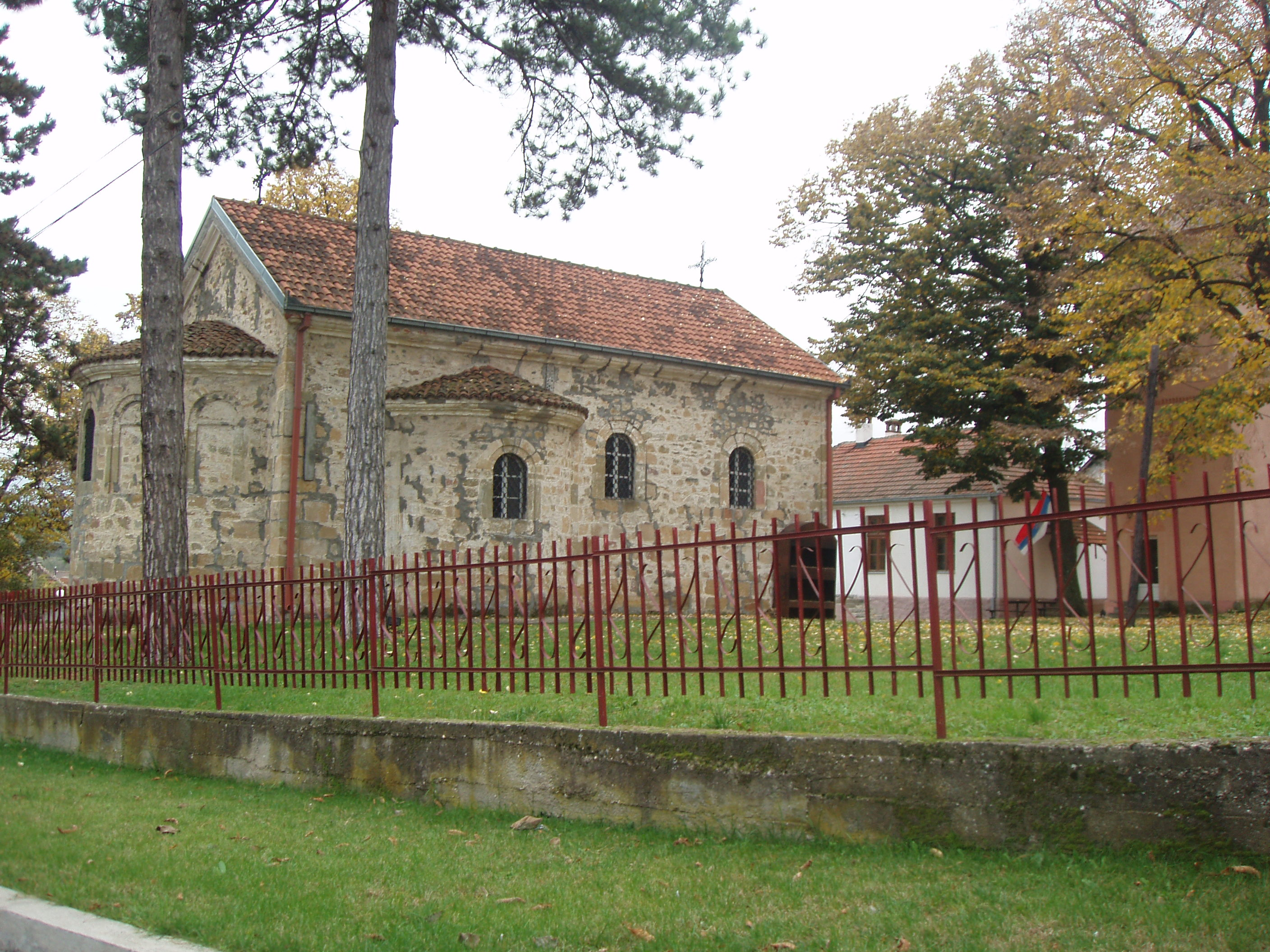
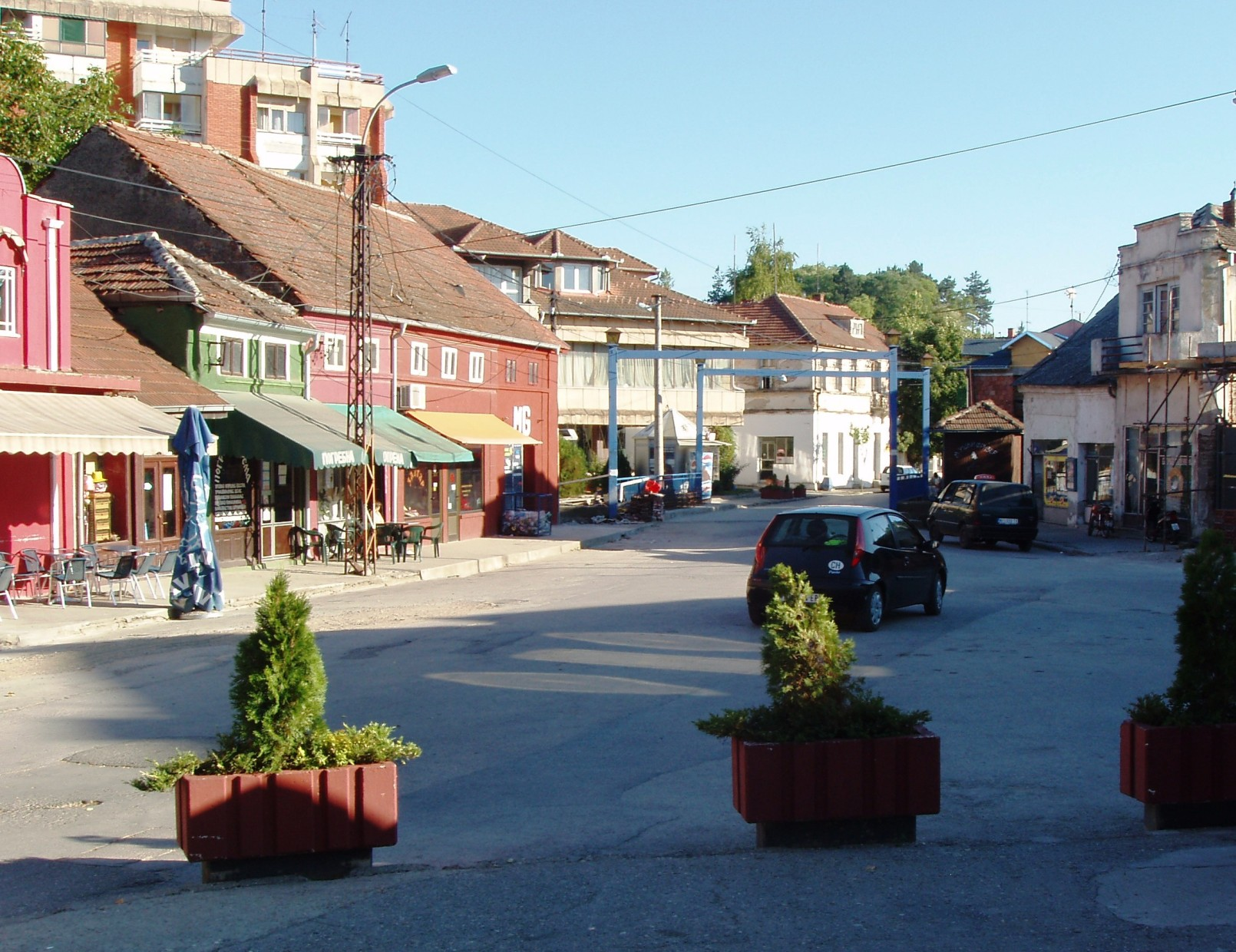
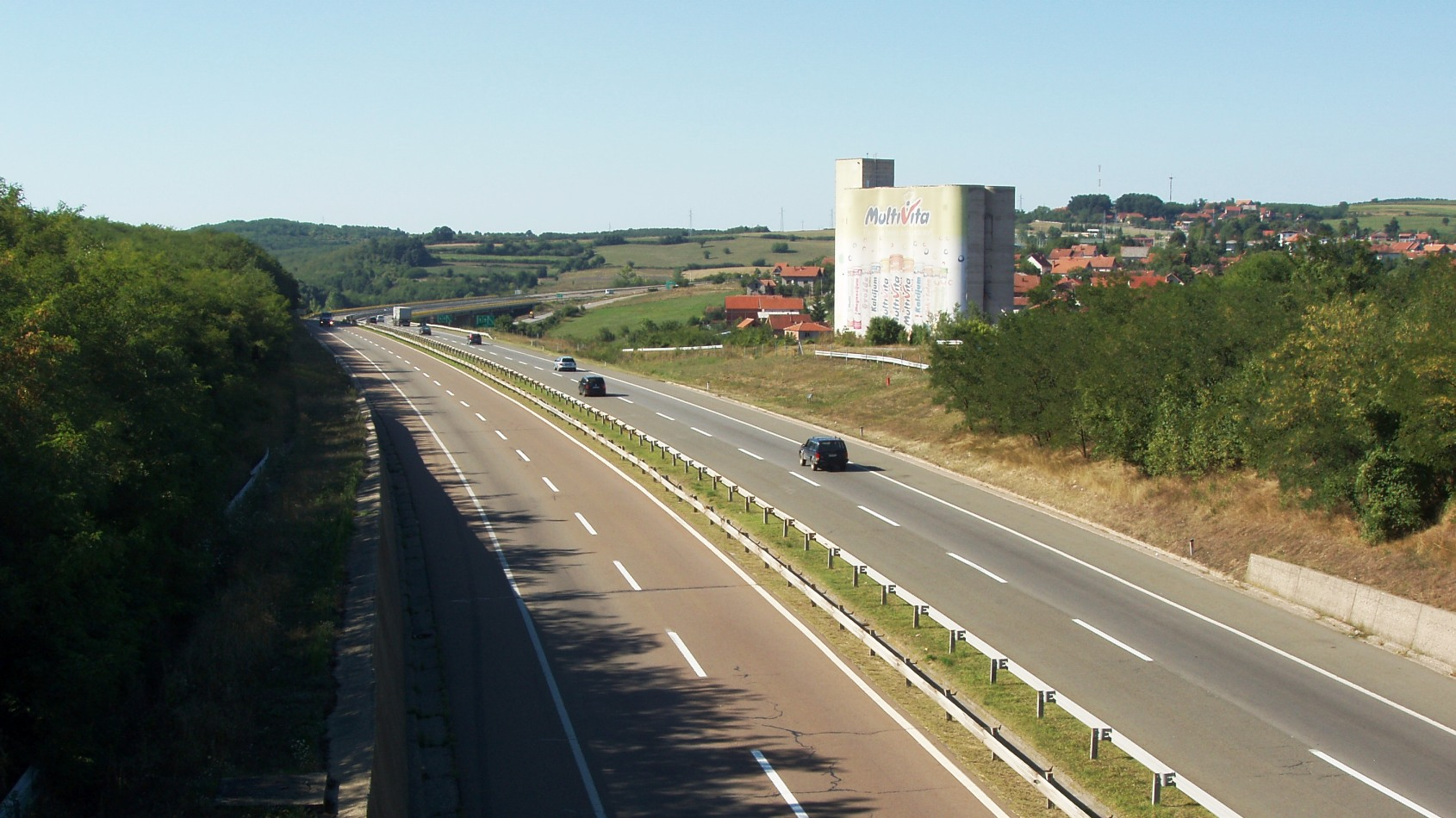
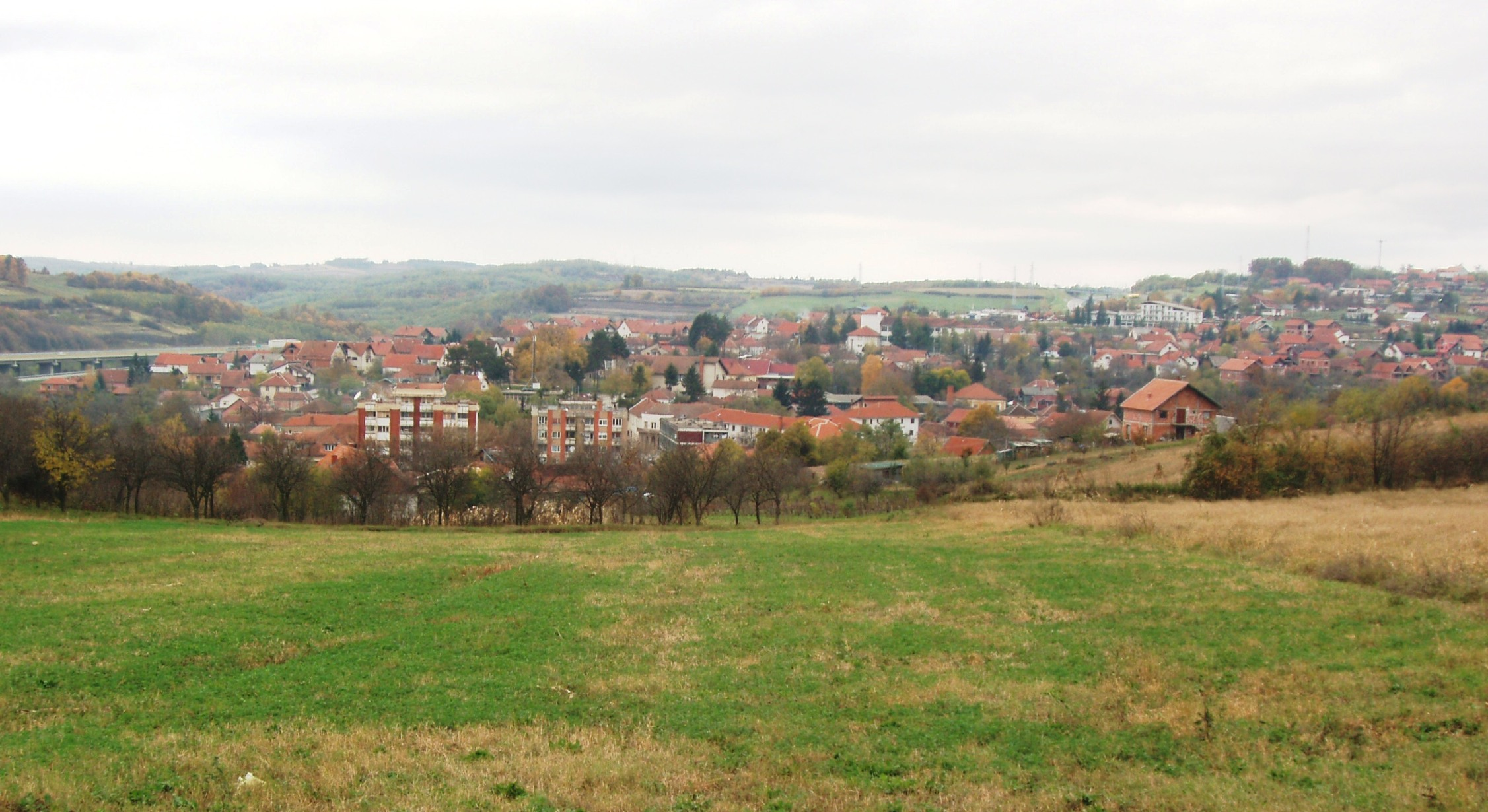
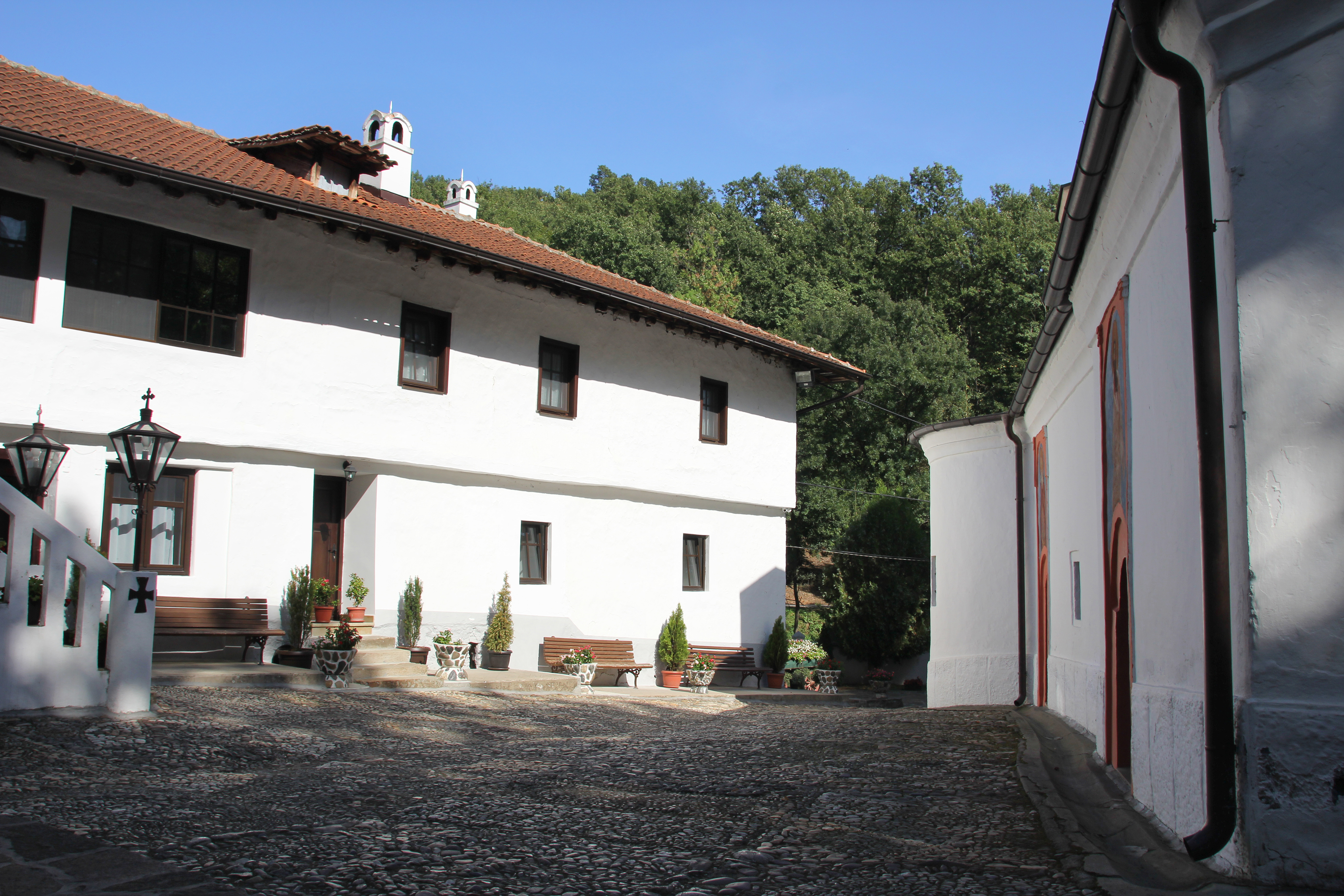
- Ražanj

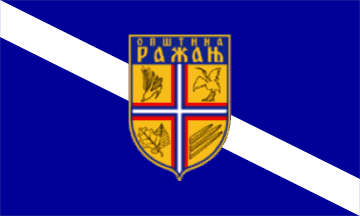
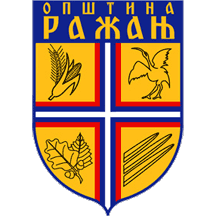
- Flag Coat of arms

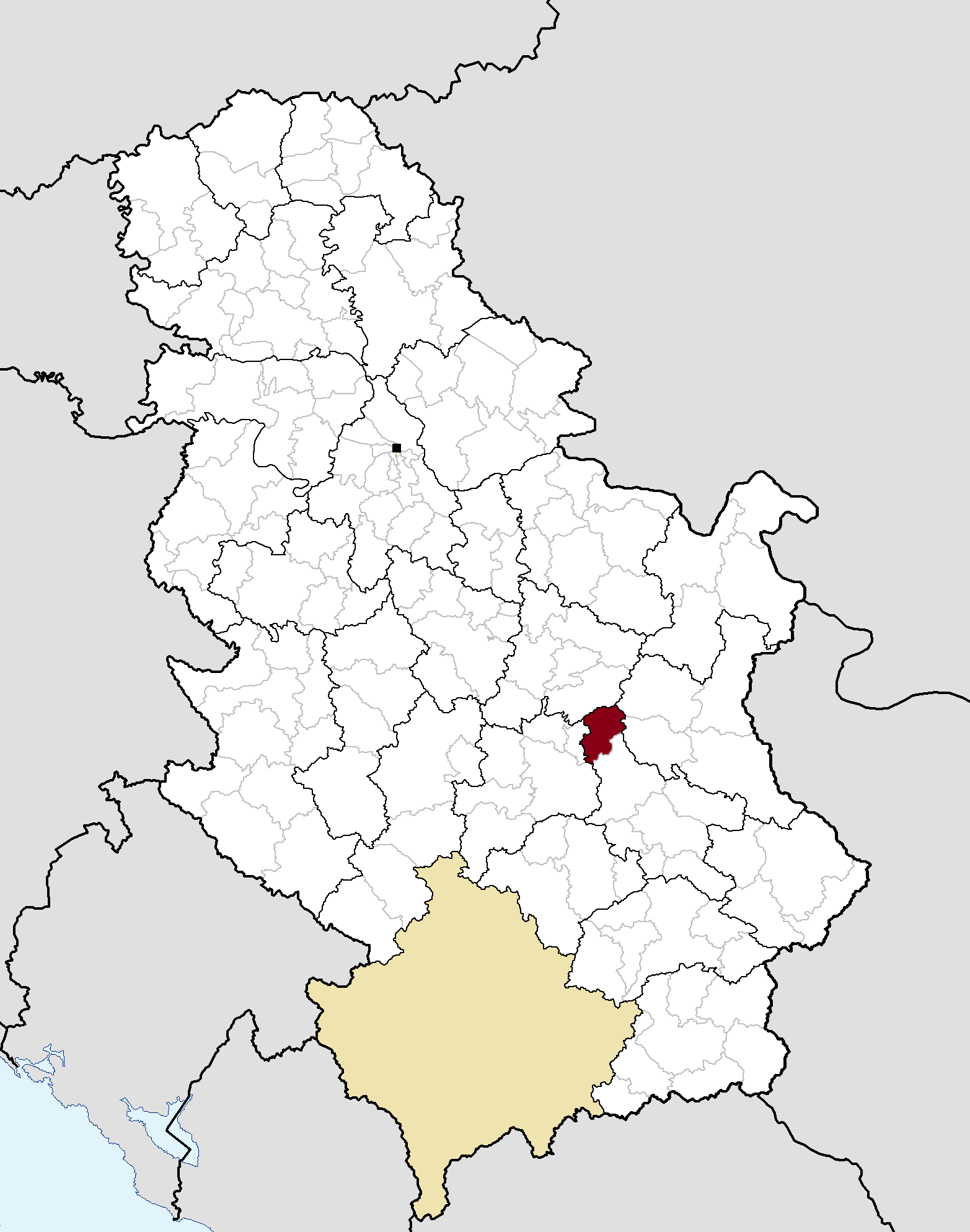
- Location of the municipality of Ražanj within Serbia
- Coordinates: 43°40′N 21°33′E
- Country: Serbia
- Region: Southern and Eastern Serbia
- District: Nišava
- Settlements: 23

Government
  - Mayor: Dobrica Stojković (SNS)

Area
  - Municipality: 289 km^{2} (112 sq mi)
- Elevation: 264 m (866 ft)

Population (2022 census)
  - Municipality: 7,010
- Time zone: UTC+1 (CET)
  - Summer (DST): UTC+2 (CEST)
- Postal code: 37215
- Area code: +381(0)37
- Car plates: NI
- Website: www.razanj.org

Ražanj (Serbian Cyrillic: Ражањ) is a village and municipality located in the Nišava District of southern Serbia. The municipality consists of 23 settlements, having a total population of 7,010 inhabitants, with 1,138 inhabitants living in Ražanj itself (2022 census). The municipality covers an area of 289 square kilometers, and it is located 50 kilometers (31 mi) northwest of Niš.

== Etymology ==
In Serbian, "ražanj" means "stake". In Roman times it was called Cametas.

== History ==
From 1929 to 1941, Ražanj was part of the Morava Banovina of the Kingdom of Yugoslavia.

== Demographics ==
Historical population
Year	Pop.	±% p.a.
1948	18,931	—
1953	19,623	+0.72%
1961	18,829	−0.51%
1971	17,113	−0.95%
1981	15,586	−0.93%
1991	13,582	−1.37%
2002	11,369	−1.60%
2011	9,150	−2.38%
2022	7,010	−2.39%

According to the last official census done in 2011, the municipality of Ražanj has 9,150 inhabitants.

=== Ethnic groups ===
The ethnic composition of the municipality is as follows:

Ethnic group	Population	%
Serbs	8,815	96.34%
Roma	195	2.13%
Macedonians	11	0.12%
Croats	3	0.03%
Others	126	1.38%
Total	9,150	

== Infrastructure ==
The main transport routes crossing the territories of the municipality of Ražanj are the Belgrade-Niš Highway as well as the Belgrade-Niš Railway. The Belgrade-Niš highway is a national key transport route and accordingly a vital transport route for the people living in the municipality of Ražanj. Two railroad stations are located within the area of the municipality (Braljina and Đunis). These are connected to the Serbian railroad network through the Belgrade-Niš railroad.

== Economy ==
There are 62 companies currently present in the municipality of Ražanj. The majority of these are small firms, employing between 1 and 5 workers, while the rest are companies with 5 to 50 employees. The level of unemployment is higher in the municipality of Ražanj than in the other municipalities of the Nišava District. In addition, net earnings are about 26% lower than the national average of the Republic of Serbia. These numbers are partly explained by the fact that the municipality of Ražanj has a relatively old population (about 32% of the rural population are older than 60 years).

According to the National Bureau of Statistics, in 2007, 1,008 people were employed by state owned companies and institutions, 812 were employed by other organizations and 196 were self-employed.

Agriculture

Agriculture is the biggest economy sector in the municipality and currently 5,594 people (49% of the total population) work in agriculture. The major part of the territory of the municipality of Ražanj is covered by arable areas, woodlands come second, fields and meadows come third and then fruit farms and vineyards. The agricultural land covers 59.6% (16,926 ha) of the total territory and is the central economy sector of the region. The main crops are maize, wheat, barley and oats. Arable areas cover 72.92% of the total agricultural area while the rest are covered by fruit farms (5.02%), vineyards (3.22%) and fields and meadows (16.91%). According to 2007 figures, the territory of the municipality Ražanj had a cattle population of about 4,000 heads, a swine population of 13,000 heads, a goat and sheep population of 3,500 animals, and a poultry population of about 65,000 hens.

Even if agriculture is the primary economy sector of the municipality today, it has great future potentials only by making it more market-oriented and efficient. On the territory of the municipality Razanj there are currently more than 1520 registered farms. According to the National Bureau of Statistics, in 2007, 96.60% of the land was privately owned while 2.85% was owned by the state.

Economic figures

The following table gives a preview of total number of employed people per their core activity (as of 2017):

Activity	Total
Agriculture, forestry and fishing	63
Mining	-
Processing industry	168
Distribution of power, gas and water	8
Distribution of water and water waste management	20
Construction	34
Wholesale and retail, repair	114
Traffic, storage and communication	40
Hotels and restaurants	16
Media and telecommunications	11
Finance and insurance	3
Property stock and charter	1
Professional, scientific, innovative and technical activities	32
Administrative and other services	7
Administration and social assurance	95
Education	107
Healthcare and social work	80
Art, leisure and recreation	3
Other services	18
Total	821

== See also ==
- Nišava District
- Subdivisions of Serbia
