= Crni Timok =

Crni Timok Krivovirski Timok, Crna River
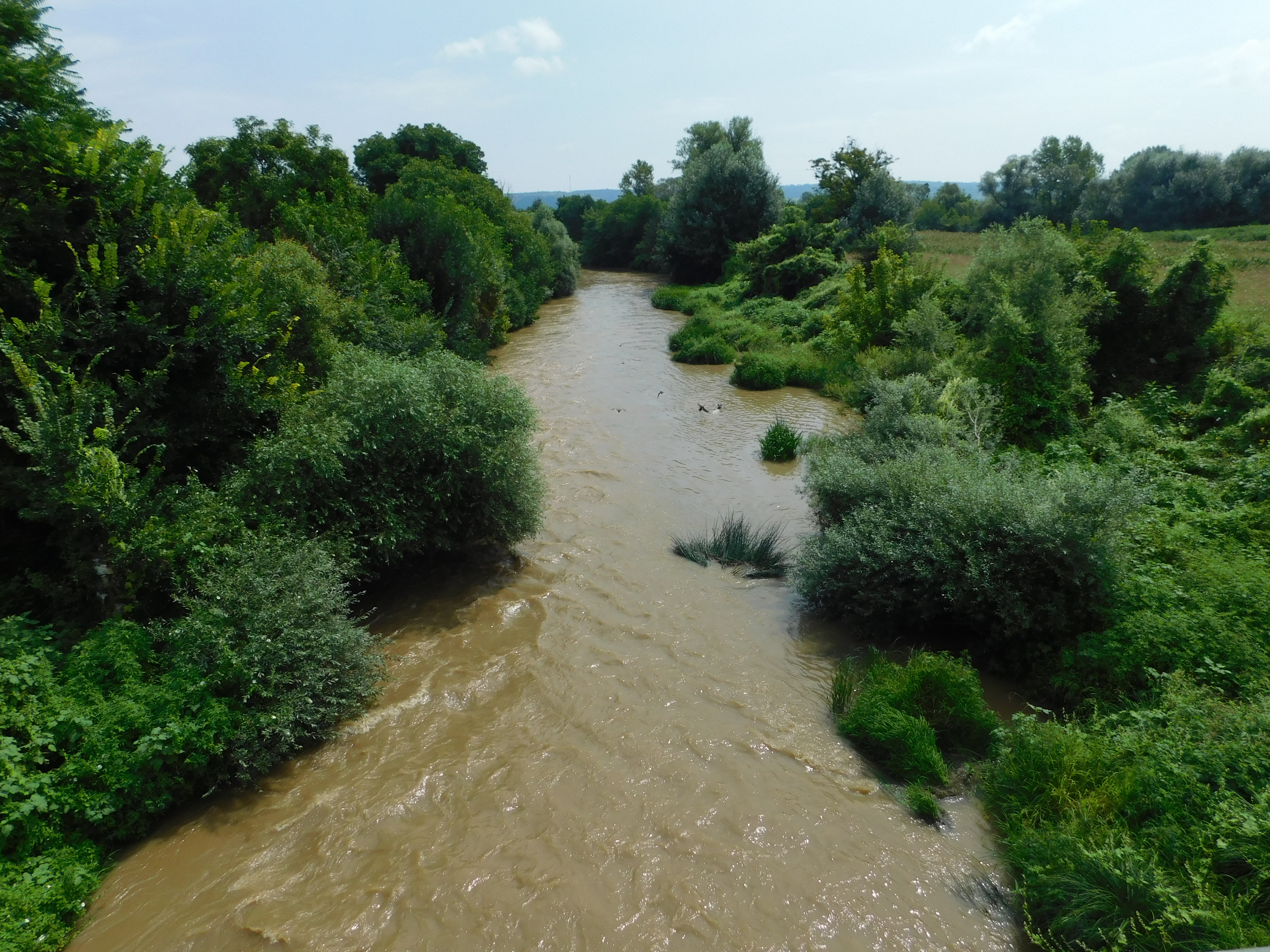
- Native name: Црни Тимок (Serbian)

Location
- Country: Serbia
- District: Bor District, Zaječar District
- City: Krivi Vir, Lukovo, Jablanica, Valakonje, Savinac, Gamzigrad, Zvezdan

Physical characteristics
- Source
  - location: Veliki Maljenik, Zaječar District
- Mouth
  - location: Zaječar, Zaječar District
  - coordinates: 43°55′12″N 22°17′52″E
- Length: 84 km (52 mi)
- Basin size: 1,232 km^{2} (476 sq mi)

Basin features
- Tributaries
  - left: Radovanska, Suva, Velika, Salešča, Šarbanovačka, Jasenova, Bajnska, Suva
  - right: Velika Suvaja, Mirovska, Arnauta, Osnička
- Progression: Timok→ Danube→ Black Sea

The Crni Timok (Serbian Cyrillic: Црни Тимок, "Black Timok"), also known as Crna River (Serbian: Црна река / Crna reka, "Black River") or Krivovirski Timok (Кривовирски Тимок, "Timok of Krivi Vir"), is a headwater of the Timok River.

It originates from the northern side of the Veliki Maljenik mountain, in the Kučaj area of eastern Serbia. It flows near the village of Krivi Vir and continues generally to the northeast, flowing through the Crna Reka Basin (Serbian: Црноречка котлина / Crnorečka kotlina), populated with many smaller villages (Lukovo, Jablanica, Valakonje, Savinac, Gamzigrad, Zvezdan). At Gamzigrad there is also an important archeological site from Roman times.

After a flow of 84 km, the Crni Timok reaches Zaječar, where it joins the Beli Timok River, forming the Veliki Timok River. It drains an area of 1,232 km^{2} (476 sq mi).

Early in its course it receives from the right the Radovanska, Suva, Velika, Salešča, Šarbanovačka, Jasenova, Bajnska and Suva rivers and from the left the Velika Suvaja, Mirovska, Arnauta, Osnička. Since most of the right tributaries come from the highly polluted area of the Bor copper mining basin, they pollute the Crni Timok.

The river is situated in the Crna Reka region.
