= State Road 35 (Serbia) =

Road in Serbia

State Road 35
- Serbian: Državni put IB reda 35; Serbian Cyrillic: Државни пут IБ реда 35

Route information
- Part of E771 HE Đerdap I-Malča; E80 Malča-Trupale; E75 E80 Trupale-Merošina; E80 Merošina-Pristina; E851 Pristina-Vërmica
- Maintained by JP "Putevi Srbije" (SRB) / Ministria e Infrastrukturës (RKS)
- Length: 435.186 km (270.412 mi) 306.953 km (190.732 mi) (excluding Kosovo)

Major junctions
- From: Romania-Serbia border at HE Đerdap I,
- To: Serbia-Kosovo border at Merdare, Road M25; Kosovo-Albania border at Vërmica,

Location
- Country: Serbia
- Districts: Bor, Zaječar, Nišava, Toplica (SRB) / Pristina, Ferizaj, Prizren (RKS)

Highway system
- Roads in Serbia; Motorways
← 34	→ 36

State Road 35 is an IB-class road in southeastern Serbia and Kosovo, connecting Romania at HE Đerdap I with Albania at Vërmica.

Before the new road categorization regulation given in 2013, the route wore the following names: M 25, M 1.12, M 1, M 9 and M 2 (before 2012) / 14, A5 and A1 (after 2012).

The existing route is a main road with two traffic lanes. By the valid Space Plan of the Republic of Serbia, its section of the road is not planned for upgrading to a motorway and is expected to be conditioned in its current state.

The road is a part of following European routes: E75, E80, E771 and E851.

== Sections ==
Section number	Length	Distance	Section name
03501	1.050 km (0.652 mi)	1.050 km (0.652 mi)	Romania-Serbia border (HE Đerdap I) - "HE Đerdap I" dam
03502	9.260 km (5.754 mi)	10.310 km (6.406 mi)	"HE Đerdap I" dam - Kladovo
03503	10.196 km (6.336 mi)	20.506 km (12.742 mi)	Kladovo - Milutinovac
03504	13.816 km (8.585 mi)	34.322 km (21.327 mi)	Milutinovac - Brza Palanka
03505	5.472 km (3.400 mi)	39.794 km (24.727 mi)	Brza Palanka - Slatina river (Slatina)
03506	16.333 km (10.149 mi)	56.127 km (34.876 mi)	Slatina river (Slatina) - Dušanovac
03507	7.800 km (4.847 mi)	63.927 km (39.722 mi)	Dušanovac - Negotin (entrance)
03508	3.370 km (2.094 mi)	67.297 km (41.816 mi)	Negotin (entrance) - Bukovo
03509	19.959 km (12.402 mi)	87.256 km (54.218 mi)	Bukovo - Salaš
03510	19.485 km (12.107 mi)	106.741 km (66.326 mi)	Salaš - Rgotina
03511	3.758 km (2.335 mi)	110.499 km (68.661 mi)	Rgotina - Vražogrnac (Bor)
03512	0.624 km (0.388 mi)	111.123 km (69.049 mi)	Vražogrnac (Bor) - Vražogrnac
03513	2.549 km (1.584 mi)	113.672 km (70.633 mi)	Vražogrnac - Zaječar (Zvezdan)
03514	1.155 km (0.718 mi)	114.827 km (71.350 mi)	Zaječar (Zvezdan) - Zaječar (Veliki Izvor)
03515	2.029 km (1.261 mi)	116.856 km (72.611 mi)	Zaječar (Veliki Izvor) - Zaječar (Vrška Čuka)
03516	12.428 km (7.722 mi)	129.284 km (80.333 mi)	Zaječar (Vrška Čuka) - Vratarnica
03517	13.109 km (8.146 mi)	142.393 km (88.479 mi)	Vratarnica - Minićevo (Vitkovac)
03518	1.429 km (0.888 mi)	143.822 km (89.367 mi)	Minićevo (Vitkovac) - Minićevo (Debelica)
03519	11.163 km (6.936 mi)	154.985 km (96.303 mi)	Minićevo (Debelica) - Knjaževac (Kalna)
03520	0.776 km (0.482 mi)	155.761 km (96.785 mi)	Knjaževac (Kalna) - Knjaževac
03521	28.197 km (17.521 mi)	183.958 km (114.306 mi)	Knjaževac - Svrljig
03522	0.068 km (0.042 mi)	184.026 km (114.348 mi)	Svrljig - Svrljig (Popšica)
03523	14.365 km (8.926 mi)	198.391 km (123.274 mi)	Svrljig (Popšica) - Malča
03524	2.182 km (1.356 mi)	200.573 km (124.630 mi)	Malča - Malča (Road 259)
03525	0.360 km (0.224 mi)	200.933 km (124.854 mi)	Malča (Road 259) - Malča interchange
4006	7.486 km (4.652 mi)	208.419 km (129.506 mi)	Malča interchange - Niš-east interchange (overlap with)
4004	6.720 km (4.176 mi)	215.139 km (133.681 mi)	Niš-east interchange - Niš-north interchange (overlap with)
4002	2.853 km (1.773 mi)	217.992 km (135.454 mi)	Niš-north interchange - Trupale interchange (overlap with)
1097	3.396 km (2.110 mi)	221.388 km (137.564 mi)	Trupale interchange - Niš-south interchange (overlap with)
1099	5.629 km (3.498 mi)	227.017 km (141.062 mi)	Niš-south interchange - Merošina interchange (overlap with)
03526	7.069 km (4.392 mi)	234.086 km (145.454 mi)	Merošina interchange - Merošina
03527	11.803 km (7.334 mi)	245.889 km (152.788 mi)	Merošina - Prokuplje (Orljane)
03528	1.407 km (0.874 mi)	246.936 km (153.439 mi)	Prokuplje (Orljane) - Prokuplje (Vukanja)
03529	0.757 km (0.470 mi)	247.693 km (153.909 mi)	Prokuplje (Vukanja) - Prokuplje
03530	0.962 km (0.598 mi)	248.655 km (154.507 mi)	Prokuplje - Prokuplje (Ćukovac)
03531	8.265 km (5.136 mi)	256.920 km (159.643 mi)	Prokuplje (Ćukovac) - Potočić (Donja Toponica)
03532	0.141 km (0.088 mi)	257.061 km (159.730 mi)	Potočić (Donja Toponica) - Potočić (Mala Plana)
03533	6.904 km (4.290 mi)	263.965 km (164.020 mi)	Potočić (Mala Plana) - Beloljin
03534	14.882 km (9.247 mi)	278.847 km (173.267 mi)	Beloljin - Kuršumlija
03535	9.239 km (5.741 mi)	288.086 km (179.008 mi)	Kuršumlija - Rudare
03536	18.867 km (11.723 mi)	306.953 km (190.732 mi)	Rudare - Kosovo border (Merdare)
Sections Inside Kosovo
03537	5.658 km (3.516 mi)	312.611 km (194.247 mi)	Kosovo border (Merdare) - Podujevo (south)
03538	2.196 km (1.365 mi)	314.807 km (195.612 mi)	Podujevo (south) - Podujevo (north)
03539	8.191 km (5.090 mi)	322.998 km (200.702 mi)	Podujevo (north) - Luzhane
03540	8.732 km (5.426 mi)	331.730 km (206.127 mi)	Luzhane - Lebane
03541	8.830 km (5.487 mi)	340.560 km (211.614 mi)	Lebane - Pristina
03542	3.200 km (1.988 mi)	343.760 km (213.603 mi)	Pristina - Peja
03115	2.846 km (1.768 mi)	346.606 km (215.371 mi)	Peja - Čaglavica
03116	7.775 km (4.831 mi)	354.381 km (220.202 mi)	Čaglavica - Llapnaselle
03543	6.284 km (3.905 mi)	360.665 km (224.107 mi)	Llapnaselle - Lipjan
03544	5.218 km (3.242 mi)	365.883 km (227.349 mi)	Lipljan - Gjurakoc
03545	5.636 km (3.502 mi)	371.519 km (230.851 mi)	Gjurakoc - Štimlje
03546	7.021 km (4.363 mi)	378.540 km (235.214 mi)	Štimlje - Carraleve
03547	11.676 km (7.255 mi)	390.216 km (242.469 mi)	Carraleve- Duhel
03548	7.629 km (4.740 mi)	397.845 km (247.209 mi)	Duhel - Studençan
03549	2.639 km (1.640 mi)	400.484 km (248.849 mi)	Suva Reka (south) - Suva Reka (north)
03550	16.470 km (10.234 mi)	416.954 km (259.083 mi)	Suva Reka (north) - Prizren (Brezovica)
03551	0.810 km (0.503 mi)	417.764 km (259.587 mi)	Prizren (Brezovica) - Prizren
03552	11.100 km (6.897 mi)	428.864 km (266.484 mi)	Prizren (Landovica) - Zhur
03553	6.322 km (3.928 mi)	435.186 km (270.412 mi)	Zhur - Kosovo-Albania border (Vërmica)

== See also ==
- Roads in Serbia
- Roads in Kosovo
