= State Road 39 (Serbia) =

Road in Serbia

State Road 39
- Serbian: Državni put IB reda 39; Serbian Cyrillic: Државни пут IБ реда 39

Route information
- Maintained by JP "Putevi Srbije" (SRB) / Ministria e Infrastrukturës (RKS)
- Length: 287.600 km (178.706 mi) 145.681 km (90.522 mi) (excluding Kosovo)

Major junctions
- From: Pirot
- To: Serbia-Kosovo border at Mutivode, Road M-9; Kosovo-Montenegro border at Čakor Road R-9

Location
- Country: Serbia
- Districts: Pirot, Jablanica (SRB) / Prizren, Peja (RKS)

Highway system
- Roads in Serbia; Motorways
← 38	→ 40

State Road 39 is an IB-class road in southeastern Serbia and Kosovo, connecting Pirot, Serbia with Montenegro at Čakor.

Before the new road categorization regulation given in 2013, the route wore the following names: M 9 and P 101 (before 2012) / 27 (after 2012).

The existing route is a main road with two traffic lanes. By the valid Space Plan of the Republic of Serbia, its section of the road is not planned for upgrading to a motorway and is expected to be conditioned in its current state.

== Sections ==
Section number	Length (km)	Distance (km)	Section name
03901	4.197 km (2.608 mi)	4.197 km (2.608 mi)	Pirot - Sadikov Bunar
03902	15.420 km (9.582 mi)	19.617 km (12.189 mi)	Sadikov Bunar - Donji Striževac
03903	4.411 km (2.741 mi)	24.028 km (14.930 mi)	Donji Striževac - Babušnica
03904	17.253 km (10.721 mi)	41.281 km (25.651 mi)	Babušnica - Bonjince
03905	4.104 km (2.550 mi)	45.385 km (28.201 mi)	Bonjince - Svođe
03906	15.868 km (9.860 mi)	61.253 km (38.061 mi)	Svođe - Vlasotince
03907	6.988 km (4.342 mi)	68.241 km (42.403 mi)	Vlasotince - Leskovac-south
03908	4.830 km (3.001 mi)	73.071 km (45.404 mi)	Leskovac-south - Leskovac (Vlasotince)
03909	1.669 km (1.037 mi)	74.740 km (46.441 mi)	Leskovac (Vlasotince) - Leskovac (Strojkovce)
03910	1.094 km (0.680 mi)	75.834 km (47.121 mi)	Leskovac (Strojkovce) - Leskovac (Bratmilovce)
03911	1.810 km (1.125 mi)	77.644 km (48.246 mi)	Leskovac (Bratmilovce) - Leskovac (Gornje Stopanje)
03912	18.979 km (11.793 mi)	96.623 km (60.039 mi)	Leskovac (Gornje Stopanje) - Lebane (Bojnik)
03913	1.109 km (0.689 mi)	97.732 km (60.728 mi)	Lebane (Bojnik) - Lebane
03914	1.550 km (0.963 mi)	99.282 km (61.691 mi)	Lebane - Lebane (Krivača)
03915	17.931 km (11.142 mi)	117.213 km (72.833 mi)	Lebane (Krivača) - Negosavlje
03916	7.782 km (4.836 mi)	124.995 km (77.668 mi)	Negosavlje - Maćedonce
03917	12.391 km (7.699 mi)	137.386 km (85.368 mi)	Maćedonce - Tulare
03918	8.295 km (5.154 mi)	145.681 km (90.522 mi)	Tulare - Kosovo border (Mutivode)
Sections inside Kosovo
03919	34.117 km (21.199 mi)	179.798 km (111.721 mi)	Kosovo border (Mutivode) - Pristina (Lebane)
03542	3.200 km (1.988 mi)	182.998 km (113.710 mi)	Pristina (Lebane) - Pristina (overlap with)
03920	12.403 km (7.707 mi)	195.401 km (121.417 mi)	Pristina - Velika Slatina (Obilić)
03921	0.223 km (0.139 mi)	195.624 km (121.555 mi)	Velika Slatina (Obilić) - Velika Slatina (Magura)
03922	10.716 km (6.659 mi)	206.340 km (128.214 mi)	Velika Slatina (Magura) - Komorane
03923	5.977 km (3.714 mi)	212.317 km (131.928 mi)	Komorane - Lapušnik
03924	11.503 km (7.148 mi)	223.820 km (139.075 mi)	Lapušnik - Kijevo
03925	12.237 km (7.604 mi)	236.057 km (146.679 mi)	Kijevo - Dolac (Hramovik)
03926	0.629 km (0.391 mi)	236.686 km (147.070 mi)	Dolac (Hramovik) - Dolac (Klina)
03927	1.592 km (0.989 mi)	238.278 km (148.059 mi)	Dolac (Klina) - Zajmovo
03928	24.488 km (15.216 mi)	262.766 km (163.275 mi)	Zajmovo - Peja (Vitomirica)
03929	1.116 km (0.693 mi)	263.882 km (163.969 mi)	Peja (Vitomirica) - Deçan
03930	23.718 km (14.738 mi)	287.600 km (178.706 mi)	Deçan - Kosovo-Montenegro border at Čakor

== See also ==
- Roads in Serbia
- Roads in Kosovo
