= State Road 38 (Serbia) =

Road in Serbia

State Road 38
- Serbian: Državni put IB reda 38; Serbian Cyrillic: Државни пут IБ реда 38

Route information
- Maintained by JP "Putevi Srbije"
- Length: 65.953 km (40.981 mi)

Major junctions
- From: A5 E761 near Kruševac
- 215 at Kruševac: 415 near Kruševac; 208 near Razbojna; 214 at Blace
- To: 35 E80 at Beloljin

Location
- Country: Serbia
- Districts: Rasina, Toplica

Highway system
- Roads in Serbia; Motorways
| ← 37 | → 39 |

State Road 38 is an IB-class road in western and southern Serbia, connecting Makrešane with Beloljin. It is located in Šumadija and Western Serbia and Southern and Eastern Serbia regions. As of 2026, the section from the A5 motorway to the Rasina river bridge is finished but currently closed. It is unknown when this section will open.

Before the new road categorization regulation given in 2013, the route wore the following names: O 18, P 102, P 221б, P 102 and P 222 (before 2012) / 163 and 18 (after 2012).

The existing route is a main road with two traffic lanes. By the valid Space Plan of Republic of Serbia the road is not planned for upgrading to motorway, and is expected to be conditioned in its current state.

== Sections ==
| Section number | Length | Distance | Section name |
|---|---|---|---|
| 03801 | 7.031 km (4.369 mi) | 7.031 km (4.369 mi) | Makrešane - Kruševac (Đunis) |
| 03802 | 1.557 km (0.967 mi) | 8.588 km (5.336 mi) | Kruševac (Đunis) - Kruševac (Jastrebac) |
| 03803 | 31.991 km (19.878 mi) | 40.579 km (25.215 mi) | Kruševac (Jastrebac) - Razbojna |
| 03804 | 13.257 km (8.238 mi) | 53.836 km (33.452 mi) | Razbojna - Blace |
| 03805 | 12.117 km (7.529 mi) | 65.953 km (40.981 mi) | Blace - Beloljin |

== See also ==
- Roads in Serbia
