= State Road 36 (Serbia) =

Road in Serbia

State Road 36
- Serbian: Državni put IB reda 36; Serbian Cyrillic: Државни пут IБ реда 36
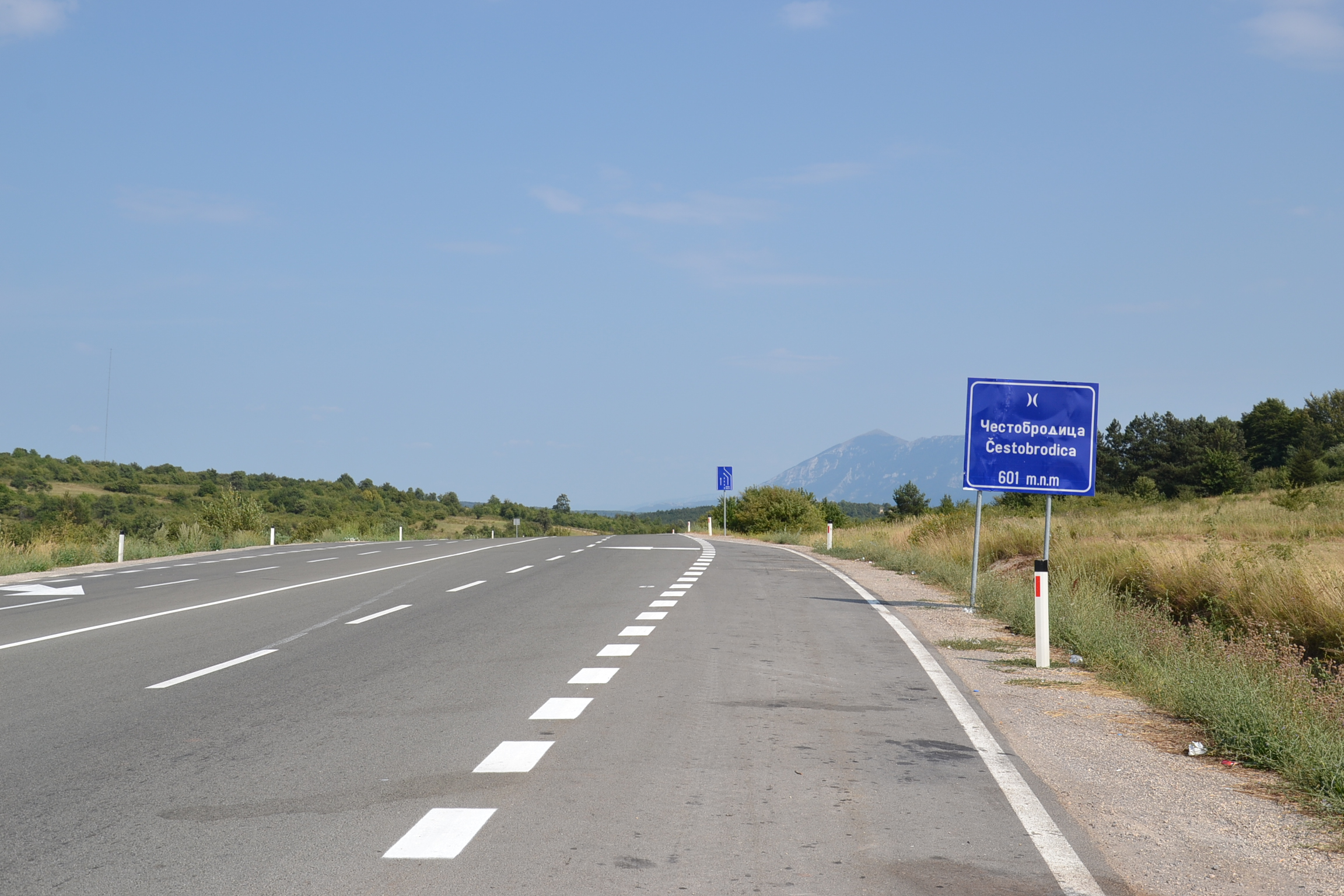

Route information
- Part of E761 Paraćin-Zaječar
- Maintained by JP "Putevi Srbije"
- Length: 96.397 km (59.898 mi)

Major junctions
- From: Paraćin E75
- Selište (Šarbanovac) 37 Zaječar 35 E771
- To: Serbia-Bulgaria border at Vrška Čuka

Location
- Country: Serbia
- Districts: Pomoravlje, Zaječar, Bor

Highway system
- Roads in Serbia; Motorways
← 35	→ 37

State Road 36 is an IB-class road in western and eastern Serbia, connecting Paraćin with Bulgaria at Vrška Čuka. It is located in Šumadija and Western Serbia and Southern and Eastern Serbia regions.

Before the new road categorization regulation given in 2013, the route wore the following names: M 5 (before 2012) / 24 (after 2012).

The existing route is a main road with two traffic lanes. By the valid Space Plan of Republic of Serbia the road is not planned for upgrading to motorway, and is expected to be conditioned in its current state.

The section between Paraćin and Zaječar is a part of European route E761.

== Sections ==
Section number	Length	Distance	Section name
03601	3.299 km (2.050 mi)	3.299 km (2.050 mi)	Paraćin interchange - Davidovac (Popovac)
03602	12.908 km (8.021 mi)	16.207 km (10.071 mi)	Davidovac (Popovac) - Grza
03603	7.870 km (4.890 mi)	24.077 km (14.961 mi)	Grza - Straža
03604	17.961 km (11.160 mi)	42.038 km (26.121 mi)	Straža - Mirovo
03605	6.836 km (4.248 mi)	48.874 km (30.369 mi)	Mirovo - Boljevac
03606	5.567 km (3.459 mi)	54.441 km (33.828 mi)	Boljevac - Valakonje
03607	11.162 km (6.936 mi)	65.603 km (40.764 mi)	Valakonje - Selište
03608	6.859 km (4.262 mi)	72.462 km (45.026 mi)	Selište - Gamzigradska Banja
03609	5.078 km (3.155 mi)	77.540 km (48.181 mi)	Gamzigradska Banja - Gamzigrad
03610	1.525 km (0.948 mi)	79.065 km (49.129 mi)	Gamzigrad - Zvezdan
03611	3.300 km (2.051 mi)	82.365 km (51.179 mi)	Zvezdan - Lubnica
03612	1.347 km (0.837 mi)	83.712 km (52.016 mi)	Lubnica - Zaječar (Šljivar)
03613	2.698 km (1.676 mi) / 0.629 km (0.391 mi)	86.410 km (53.693 mi)	Zaječar (Šljivar) - Zaječar (Vrška Čuka)
03614	9.987 km (6.206 mi)	96.397 km (59.898 mi)	Zaječar (Vrška Čuka) - Serbia-Bulgaria border (Vrška Čuka)

== See also ==
- Roads in Serbia
