= Lapušnja Monastery =

Orthodox Monastery

Lapušnja Monastery Манастир Лапушња
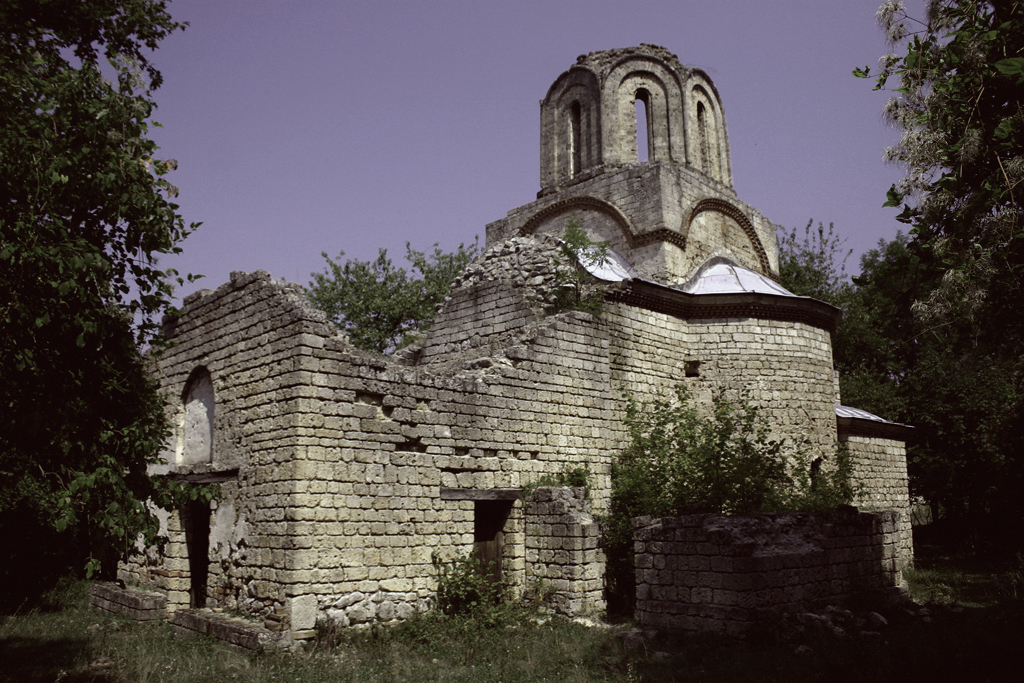
- Interactive map of Lapušnja Monastery; Манастир Лапушња

Monastery information
- Full name: Манастир – Лапушња
- Order: Serbian Orthodox
- Established: 1500–1501
- Dedication: Saint Nicholas

People
- Founders: Jovan Radul and Gergina

Site
- Location: Lukovo
- Coordinates: 43.7884°N 21.7866°E
- Public access: No

Lapušnja Monastery is located on the slopes of Rtanj, near the village of Lukovo, not far from Boljevac, Serbia. It was built by duke Jovan Radul and the great parkalab, prefect Gergina in 1500/1501. year, and the monastery church of St. Nicholas was painted in 1510, under the supervision of Prince Bogoj. The ruins of the monastery were preserved in 1973.

Today, Lapušnja is under the protection of the Republic of Serbia, as a cultural monument of great importance.

== Architecture and painting of the monastery church ==
The church in Lapušnja has a triconchonal base, with a narthex on the west and a semicircular altar apse on the east. The altar part is divided into three parts, as well as the nave, which consists of three bays of unequal dimensions. An eight-sided dome rises above the middle one, resting on a square base. In its corners there are stone rosettes, which are also the only architectural decoration of the church. The side apses are five-sided on the outside, and a smaller chapel is attached to the south wall of the church.

The fresco painting of the church has been preserved very poorly and has faded, as the church has been destroyed for several centuries. On the founding composition, located at the junction of the north and west walls of the nave, Radul and Gergina are shown, as well as Prince Bogoje with his wife Mara and children. There are also frescoes of holy warriors, archbishops, compositions of Great Holidays and liturgical themes, while biblical prophets and evangelists can be seen in the dome.

== Gallery ==
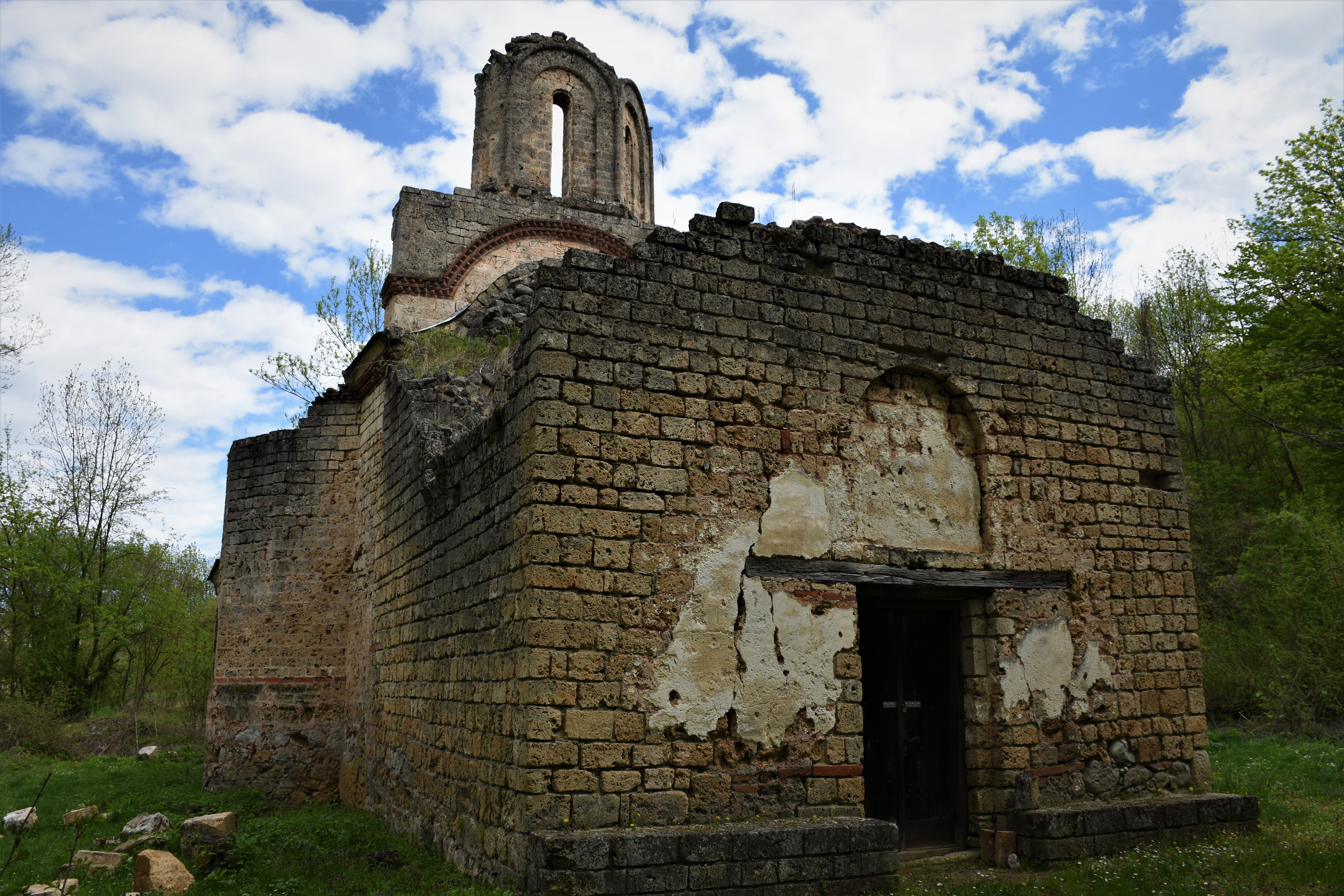
Lapušnja Monastery

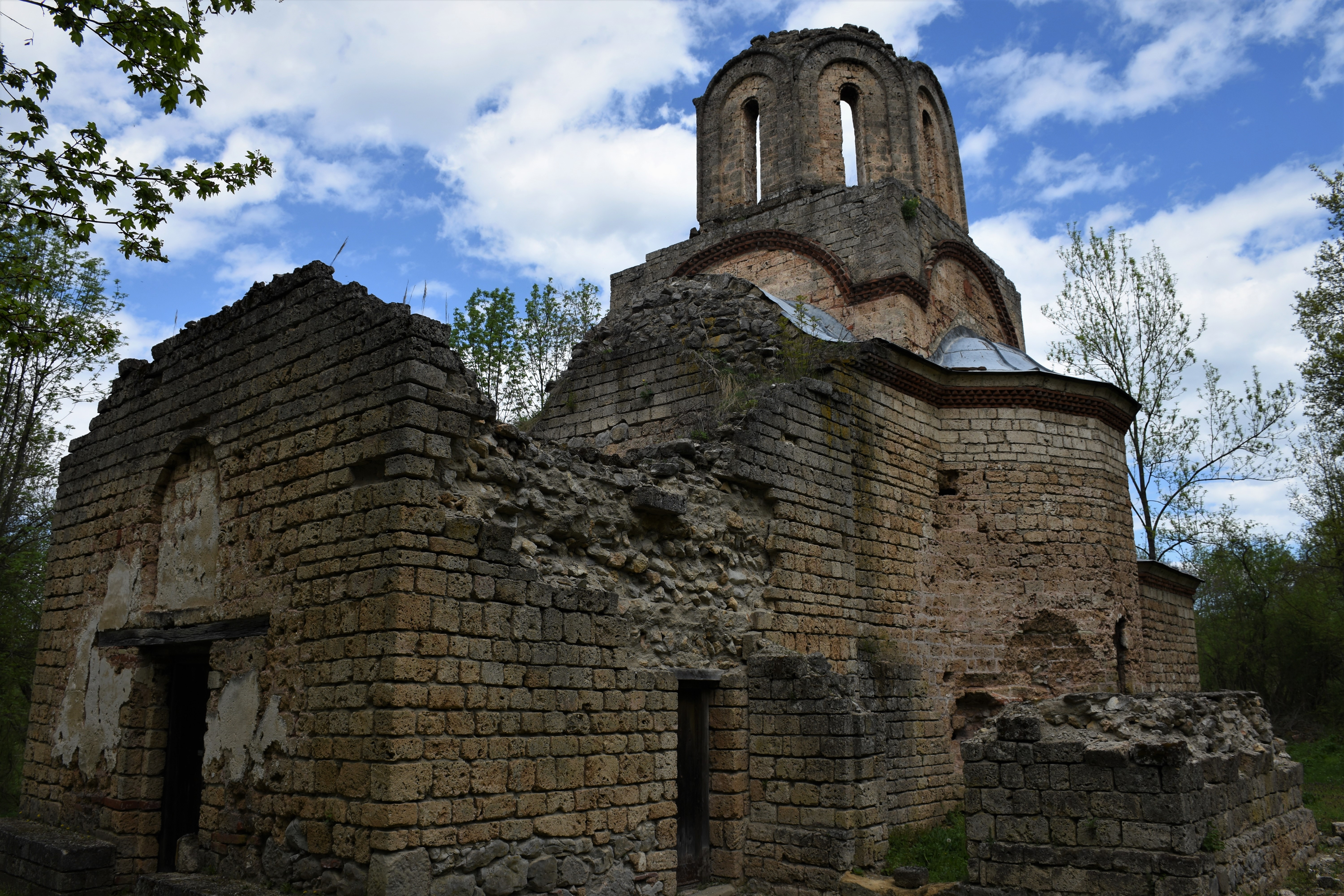
Lapušnja Monastery

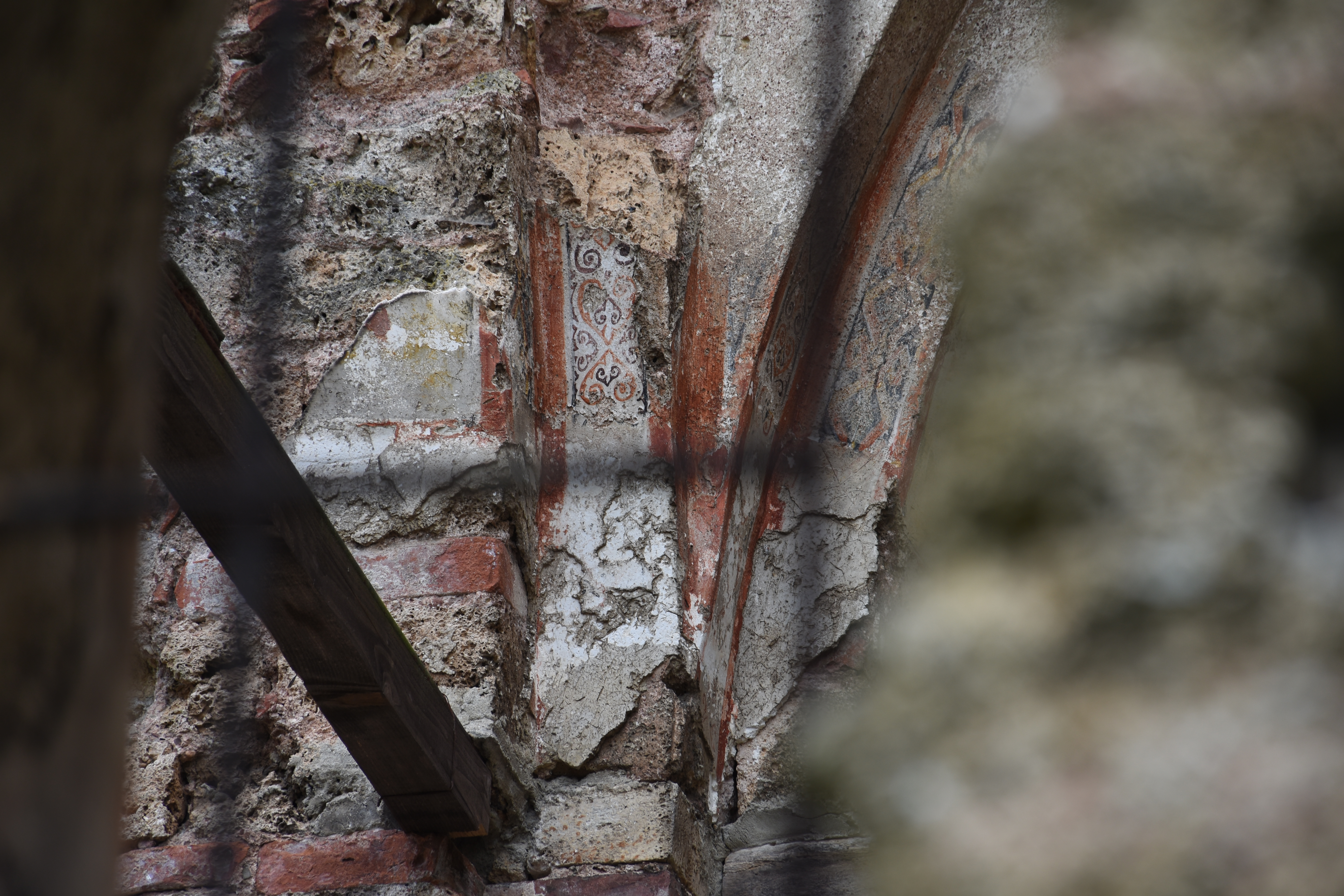
Lapušnja Monastery detail

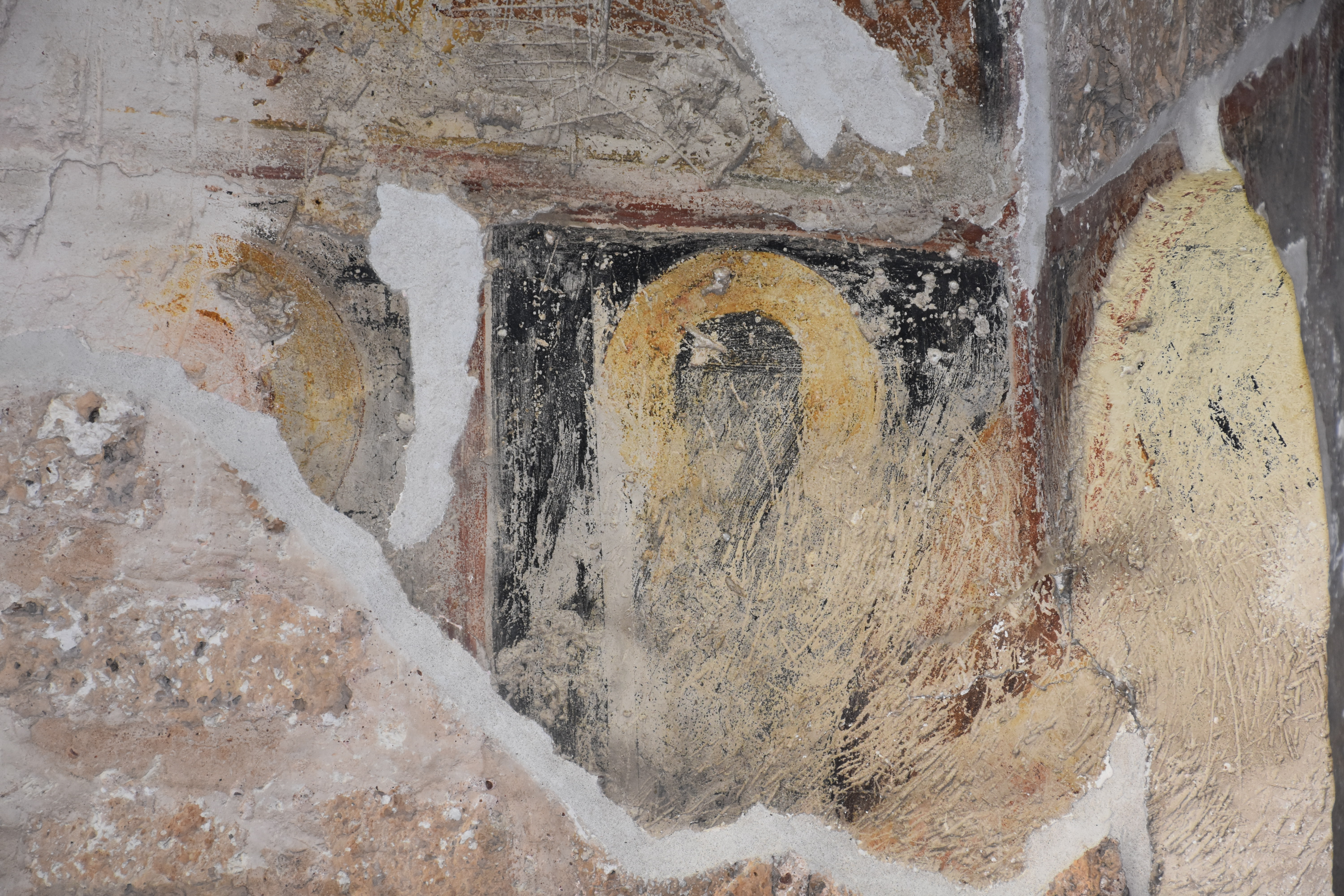
Lapušnja Monastery detail of the preserved fresca
