= II-14 road (Bulgaria) =

Road in Bulgaria

Republic Road I-14
- Републикански път I-14

Route information
- Length: 41.7 km (25.9 mi)

Major junctions
- From: Km 8.3 of I-1, Novoseltsi
- To: Vrashka Chuka at the Bulgaria–Serbia border; Road 36 in Serbia

Location
- Country: Bulgaria
- Towns: Vidin, Kula

Highway system
- Highways in Bulgaria

Republican Road II-14 (Bulgarian: Републикански път II-14) is a second-class road in the extreme north-west of Bulgaria, running entirely in Vidin Province. Its length is 41.7 km.

== Route description ==
The road starts at Km 8.3 of the first class I-1 road near the village of Novoseltsi at the ring road of the city of Vidin and runs in direction northeast–southwest in the Danubian Plain. It passes through the villages of Bela Rada and Voynitsa, and ascends the watershed between the rivers of Topolovets and Voynishka reka. The road then runs through the town of Kula and enters the northwesternmost low sections of the Balkan Mountains, reaching the Bulgaria–Serbia border at the Vrashka Chuka Pass, where it continues as Road 36 of the Serbian road network.
