= Krivača =

Krivača may refer to:

- Krivača, Bileća, a village in the Republika Srpska, Bosnia and Herzegovina
- Krivača, Golubac, a village in Serbia
- Krivača (Lebane), a village in Serbia
- Krivača (Lučani), a village in Serbia
