= Kupusović =

Kupusović is a surname. People with the surname include:

- Njegoš Kupusović, a Serbian footballer
- Sulejman Kupusović, a Bosnian theatre director

== See also ==
- Kupusovići
