= Mali Izvor =

Mali Izvor may refer to:

- Mali izvor, a village in Tervel Municipality, Dobrich Province, Bulgaria
- Mali Izvor (Boljevac), a village in the municipality of Boljevac, Zaječar District, Serbia
- Mali Izvor (Zaječar), a village in the municipality of Zaječar, Zaječar District, Serbia
