= Dobrujevac =

Dobrujevac may refer to:

- Dobrujevac (Aleksinac), a village in Aleksinac, Serbia
- Dobrujevac (Boljevac), a village in Boljevac, Serbia
