= Rtanj, Boljevac =

Rtanj Ртањ
- Village
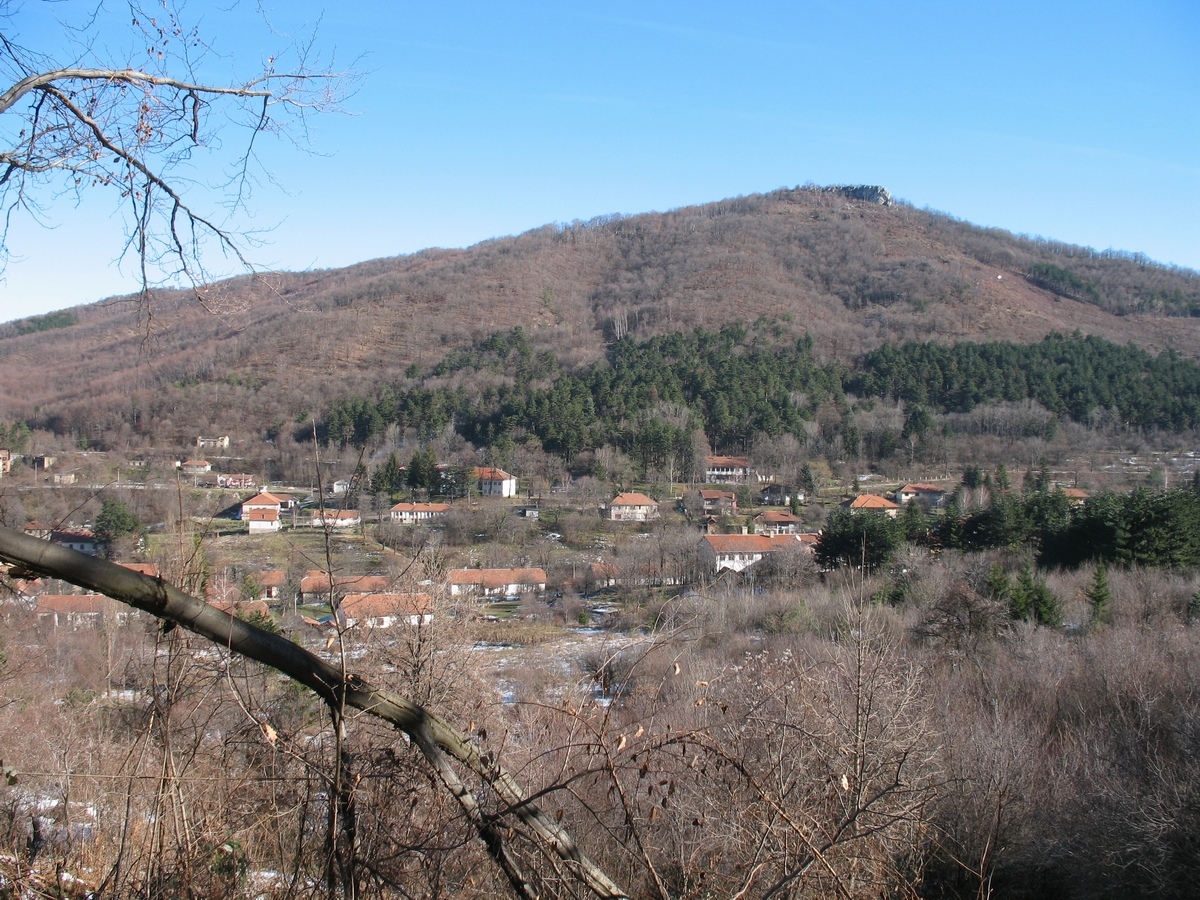

- Location within Serbia
- Coordinates: 43°46′17″N 21°56′02″E
- Country: Serbia
- District: Zaječar District
- Municipality: Boljevac

Population (2011)
  - Total: 120
- Time zone: UTC+1 (CET)
  - Summer (DST): UTC+2 (CEST)

Rtanj (Serbian Cyrillic: Ртањ) is a settlement in the municipality of Boljevac in Eastern Serbia. According to the 2011 census, it has a population of 120 people. It lies in a valley under the eponymous mountain.

Rtanj was founded in the late 19th century by a wealthy Jewish family Minh (Münch) as a mining settlement, and prospered in the early 20th century. In 1929, its population was over 2,000, chiefly miners and their families who settled from across the region. German occupation in World War II and subsequent nationalization by Yugoslav communist authorities marked the beginning of the town's decline, and the coal mine was closed in 1967. Only in the 2000s the settlement saw a certain revival and attention of investors, catering for tourists seeking peaceful vacation and hiking over the mountain. As of 2020, it hosts a luxury hotel "Ramonda" and several guest houses.

== History ==
Entrepreneur Samuilo Minh (Münch) founded a mine under the mountain in the late 19th century. Following the destruction of the facilities by the retreating Austro-Hungarian army in World War I, and Samuilo's death in 1919, his three sons renewed the town and the mine and continued the business. The eldest son Julius was the manager of the mine, and the town flourished under his rule, reaching population of 2,000 in 1929. The Minh family, in the process of developing the mine, built apartments, school, community health center, cinema, park, and other facilities. Julius committed suicide in 1931, during the economic crisis, but his wife Greta and two younger brothers Adolf and Aleksandar continued the business.

Greta Minh built a mausoleum in the form of a little chapel dedicated to her husband on the Šiljak peak. The chapel was built in 1932 and was dedicated to St. George. The local miners participated in the construction, bringing heavy stones over a long and steep incline.

In World War II, German occupiers took over the mine, and Jewish owners were forced to flee. During the course of the war, Greta hid in a mining family in the nearby village of Ilino. Adolf died while resisting arrest by Gestapo, while Aleksandar managed to survive the war. Their descents are today scattered across the world.

After World War II, the new Communist authorities demolished the chapel's dome with the cross in 1946. In an effort to find the gold and jewels which according to the folk mythology were hidden inside the mountain, the treasure hunters damaged the chapel using dynamite on several occasions since the 1980s, demolishing the remaining walls in the process.

The Rtanj coal mine was nationalized by new communist authorities in 1946. It was closed in 1967, due to recurring accidents with methane. Population of the town has been in decline since, dropping from 658 in 1961 to only 120 in 2011.

Only in the 2000s the settlement saw a certain revival and attention of investors, catering for tourists seeking peaceful vacation and hiking over the mountain. Small luxury hotel "Ramonda" was opened in 2019, and several guest houses and a hostel provide the accommodation.
