= Zvezdan Martič =

Slovenian journalist and engineer (born 1963)

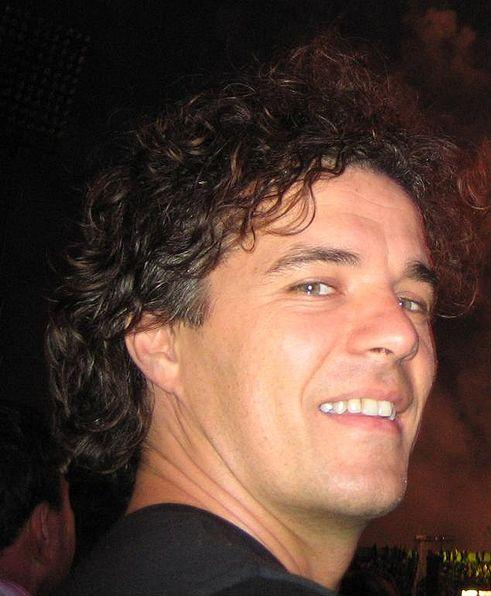
Zvezdan Martič

Zvezdan Martič (born 1963 in Celje, Yugoslavia) is a Slovenian journalist and engineer. In 2001 he inaugurated the establishment of the multimedia center at RTV Slovenija and was assigned the position of project leader since its inception until 2010. He was a member of the OLS (On line service group) at EBU (European Broadcasting Union), where he was also a member of the Benchmarking and Teletext groups. In addition, he was a College lecturer in multimedia. For more than ten years he has been the host of many talk shows (Polnočni klub, Akcent, Moje mnenje) and scriptwriter and director of many documentaries and for two years host and editor of daily news.

In 2019, he became the Assistant Director of TV Slovenija.

In July 2023, he was elected as the president of the management board of RTV Slovenia. He stepped down from the position in the end of May 2024.

In recent years, he hosted the talk show *Intervju* and worked as a director and screenwriter of documentary films, several of which were selected for the competition program of the Slovenian Film Festival (FSF).

== See also ==
- Social Innovation Camp
