= Boljevac Selo =

- Village
- Location within Serbia
- Coordinates: 43°49′30″N 21°57′36″E
- Country: Serbia
- District: Zaječar District
- Municipality: Boljevac

Population (2002)
  - Total: 315
- Time zone: UTC+1 (CET)
  - Summer (DST): UTC+2 (CEST)

Boljevac Selo (Serbian Cyrillic: Бољевац Село) is a village in the municipality of Boljevac, Serbia. According to the 2002 census, the village had a population of 315 people.
