= Dobro Polje (Boljevac) =

Dobro Polje Добро Поље
- Village
- Location within Serbia
- Coordinates: 43°46′07″N 22°02′03″E
- Country: Serbia
- District: Zaječar District
- Municipality: Boljevac

Population (2002)
  - Total: 415
- Time zone: UTC+1 (CET)
  - Summer (DST): UTC+2 (CEST)

Dobro Polje (Serbian Cyrillic: Добро Поље) is a village in the municipality of Boljevac, Serbia. According to the 2002 census, the village has a population of 415 people.
