= Nebojša Marjanović =

Serbian politician

Nebojša Marjanović (Serbian Cyrillic: Небојша Марјановић; born 1959) is a politician in Serbia. He has been the mayor of Boljevac since 2004 and briefly served in the National Assembly of Serbia in August 2020. Marjanović is a member of the Serbian Progressive Party.

== Early life and private career ==
Marjanović was born in Pirot, in what was then the People's Republic of Serbia in the Federal People's Republic of Yugoslavia. He is a doctor specializing in emergency medicine.

== Politician ==
Marjanović was first elected as mayor of Boljevac in the 2004 Serbian local elections as a candidate of the Democratic Party of Serbia (Demokratska stranka Srbije, DSS). He continued as mayor under the same party's banner following the 2008 Serbian local elections. Marjanović also was included on the DSS's coalition electoral list with New Serbia in the 2008 Serbian parliamentary election, in the 141st position. The list won thirty mandates, and he was not included in his party's assembly delegation. (From 2000 to 2011, parliamentary mandates were awarded to sponsoring parties or coalitions rather than to individual candidates, and the mandates were often assigned out of numerical order. Marjanović could have received a parliamentary mandate despite his list position, but in the event he did not.)

He subsequently left the DSS and joined the United Regions of Serbia (URS), which he led to victory in Boljevac in the 2012 Serbian local elections. He also appeared in the thirty-fourth position on the URS's electoral list in the 2012 parliamentary election. Following a 2011 electoral reform, assembly mandates were awarded in numerical order to candidates on successful lists; the list won sixteen mandates, and he was not returned.

Marjanović aligned himself with Boris Tadić's New Democratic Party for the 2014 parliamentary election. Following the election, he joined the Progressive Party, which he led to a local victory in 2016 and to a local majority victory in 2020.

=== Parliamentarian ===
Marjanović received the 183rd position on the Progressive Party's Aleksandar Vučić — For Our Children list in the 2020 Serbian parliamentary election and was elected when the list won a landslide majority with 188 out of 250 mandates. He resigned from the assembly on 20 August 2020 as he was not able to hold a dual mandate as mayor.
