= Kupusovići =

- Village
- Location within Bosnia and Herzegovina
- Coordinates: 43°53′12″N 19°16′36″E
- Country: Bosnia and Herzegovina
- Entity: Republika Srpska
- Municipality: Višegrad
- Time zone: UTC+1 (CET)
  - Summer (DST): UTC+2 (CEST)

Kupusovići (Serbian: Купусовићи) is a village in the municipality of Višegrad, Bosnia and Herzegovina.

== History ==
In Chuck Sudetic's book Blood and Vengeance, he relates a folk tale regarding the naming of the town. During Ottoman control of Bosnia, a Hodža was leading Muslims in afternoon prayer when he began yelling about a cow in a nearby cabbage patch. After the incident, locals began calling the village Kupusovići - Village of the Cabbage People.
