= Zvezdan =

Name list

Zvezdan (Serbian: Звездан) also spelled Zvjezdan is a Slavic masculine given name. Notable people with the name include:

- Zvezdan Čebinac (born 1939), former Serbian former football midfielder and manager
- Zvezdan Jovanović (born 1965), the assassin of former Serbian Prime Minister Zoran Đinđić in 2003
- Zvezdan Martič, Slovenian journalist and engineer
- Zvezdan Pejović (born 1966), retired Yugoslav professional football defender
- Zvezdan Terzić (born 1966), Serbian retired football player of Montenegrin origin

There is also:

- Zvezdan (Zaječar), village in eastern Serbia
