= Vrbovac (Boljevac) =

Vrbovac Врбовац
- Village
- Location within Serbia
- Coordinates: 43°48′48″N 22°05′53″E
- Country: Serbia
- District: Zaječar District
- Municipality: Boljevac

Population (2002)
  - Total: 190
- Time zone: UTC+1 (CET)
  - Summer (DST): UTC+2 (CEST)

Vrbovac (Serbian Cyrillic: Врбовац) is a village in the municipality of Boljevac, Serbia. According to the 2002 census, the village has a population of 190 people.
