= State Road 37 (Serbia) =

Road in Serbia

State Road 37
- Serbian: Državni put IB reda 37; Serbian Cyrillic: Државни пут IБ реда 37

Route information
- Maintained by JP "Putevi Srbije"
- Length: 40.247 km (25.008 mi)

Major junctions
- From: Selište E761
- Brestovac 161 394 Bor 166
- To: Vražogrnac E771

Location
- Country: Serbia
- Districts: Bor, Zaječar

Highway system
- Roads in Serbia; Motorways
← 36	→ 38

National/State Road 37 is an IB-class road in eastern Serbia, connecting Selište with Vražogrnac. It is located in Southern and Eastern Serbia.

Before the new road categorization regulation given in 2013, the route wore the following names: P 105, P 106б, P 106 (before 2012) / 129 and 25 (after 2012).

The existing route is a main road with two traffic lanes. By the valid Space Plan of Republic of Serbia the road is not planned for upgrading to motorway, and is expected to be conditioned in its current state.

== Sections ==
Section number	Length	Distance	Section name
03701	14.927 km (9.275 mi)	14.927 km (9.275 mi)	Selište - Brestovac
03702	3.926 km (2.440 mi)	18.853 km (11.715 mi)	Brestovac - Bor
03703	21.394 km (13.294 mi)	40.247 km (25.008 mi)	Bor - Vražogrnac (Bor)

== See also ==
- Roads in Serbia
