= Chuck Sudetic =

American writer and journalist

- Born: Cleveland, Ohio, United States
- Occupations: Writer; Journalist

Chuck Sudetic is an American former writer and journalist whose work focused mainly on the lands and peoples of Yugoslavia.

== Background ==
Born and raised in Cleveland, Ohio to American-born parents of Irish and Croatian descent, Sudetic studied British and American literature, Slavic languages, and journalism at Ohio State University, Indiana University, Cleveland State University, Davidson College in North Carolina, and the Pushkin Institute for the Russian Language in Moscow (1978); he was a Fulbright Scholar in Yugoslavia during 1984 and 1985 and traveled throughout the East-bloc countries and in the Soviet Union. Sudetic worked as an analyst for the International Crisis Group, a consultant for the International Rescue Committee, an analyst for the International Criminal Tribunal for the former Yugoslavia's Office of the Prosecutor, and a writer for the Open Society Foundations of George Soros, with whom he coauthored The Philanthropy of George Soros: Building Open Societies (Public Affairs, 2011).

For a series of country studies prepared by the United States Library of Congress's Federal Research Division, he wrote book chapters on the histories, economies, and societies of Hungary, Albania, Romania, and Yugoslavia.

== Career ==
He has written extensively on the Srebrenica massacre of 1995, international war-crimes prosecution efforts after the Balkan conflicts of the 1990s, and life from the fifth century B.C. to the present day in and around what is now the seaside town of Dubrovnik. Sudetic also wrote on the Roma of Europe, mass rape in the Democratic Republic of Congo, and crime in New York City.

Sudetic reported for The New York Times from 1990 to 1995 on Yugoslavia's breakup, including the conflict in Slovenia and the wars in Croatia and in Bosnia and Herzegovina; the transition from Communism in other countries of Southeastern Europe; and the Iraqi Kurd refugee crisis after the 1991 Gulf War.

He authored Blood and Vengeance (Norton, 1998, and Penguin, 1999), a chronicle of a Bosnian family's experiences during the turbulence of the 20th century that ended with the act of genocide committed at Srebrenica in 1995. Blood and Vengeance was named a "Notable Book" by The New York Times and a Book of the Year by The Economist, The Washington Post, and Publishers Weekly.

For a 2001 French anthology of writing on war, Sudetic contributed "Le criminel de guerre," which describes the family background and motives of the Bosnian war's most notorious killer, Milan Lukić, a Serb militia commander who led ethnic-cleansing operations in the Drina-river town of Višegrad from 1992 to 1995 and was convicted on war crimes charges in 2009 by the International Criminal Tribunal for the former Yugoslavia.

Sudetic coauthored La Caccia (Feltrinelli, 2008, released in English as Madame Prosecutor by Other Press in 2009), the memoirs of the Swiss war-crimes prosecutor, Carla Del Ponte, whose controversial revelations led to two successful international criminal investigations and the establishment of a special court to try individuals indicted on charges involving allegations of hundreds of kidnappings and murders, including alleged instances of murder linked with human organ harvesting, in Kosovo and Albania during the months after the NATO bombing campaign against Serbia in 1999.

Sudetic worked as a contributing editor to Rolling Stone and published articles in The Atlantic Monthly, The Economist, politico.eu, Mother Jones (on the effects of the United Nations sanctions against Iraq under Saddam Hussein), The Washington Post, Das Magazin (Zurich), Transitions (Prague), The Independent (London), and other periodicals. His story for Rolling Stone on the Srebrenica massacre was a finalist for the 1996 National Magazine Award.
