= Osnić =

- Village
- Location within Serbia
- Coordinates: 43°53′03″N 22°06′21″E
- Country: Serbia
- District: Zaječar District
- Municipality: Boljevac

Population (2002)
  - Total: 1,340
- Time zone: UTC+1 (CET)
  - Summer (DST): UTC+2 (CEST)

Osnić (Serbian Cyrillic: Оснић) is a village in the municipality of Boljevac, Serbia. According to the 2002 census, the village has a population of 1340 people.
