= Rujište (Boljevac) =

Rujište Рујиште
- Village
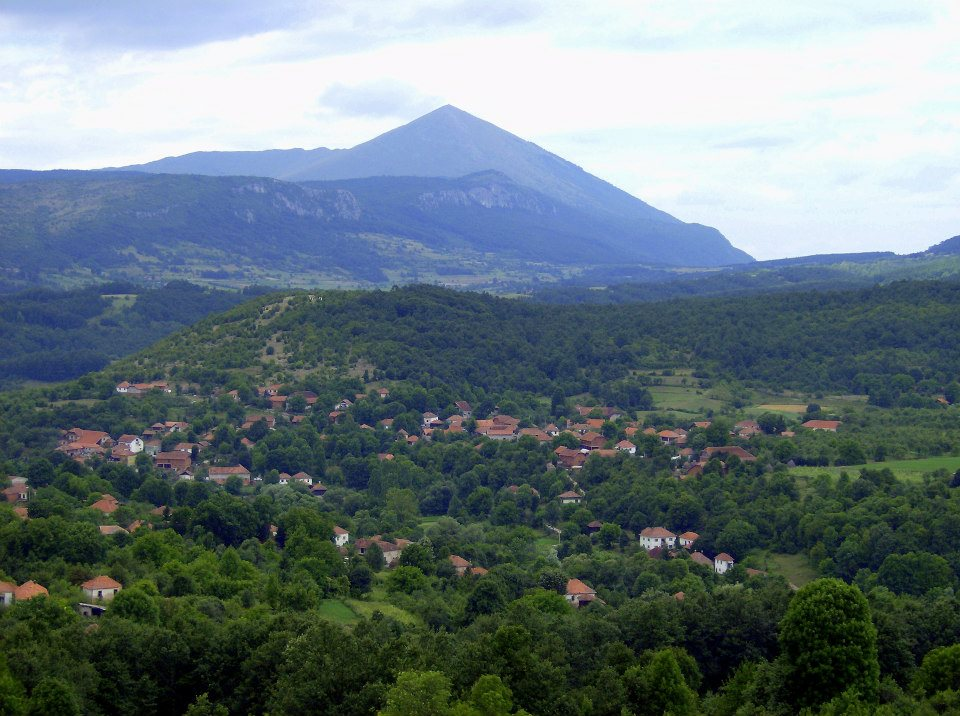

- Location within Serbia
- Coordinates: 43°43′23″N 21°59′26″E
- Country: Serbia
- District: Zaječar District
- Municipality: Boljevac

Population (2002)
  - Total: 470
- Time zone: UTC+1 (CET)
  - Summer (DST): UTC+2 (CEST)

Rujište (Serbian Cyrillic: Рујиште) is a village in the municipality of Boljevac, Serbia. According to the 2002 census, the village has a population of 470 people.
