= Ilino, Boljevac =

Ilino Илино
- Village
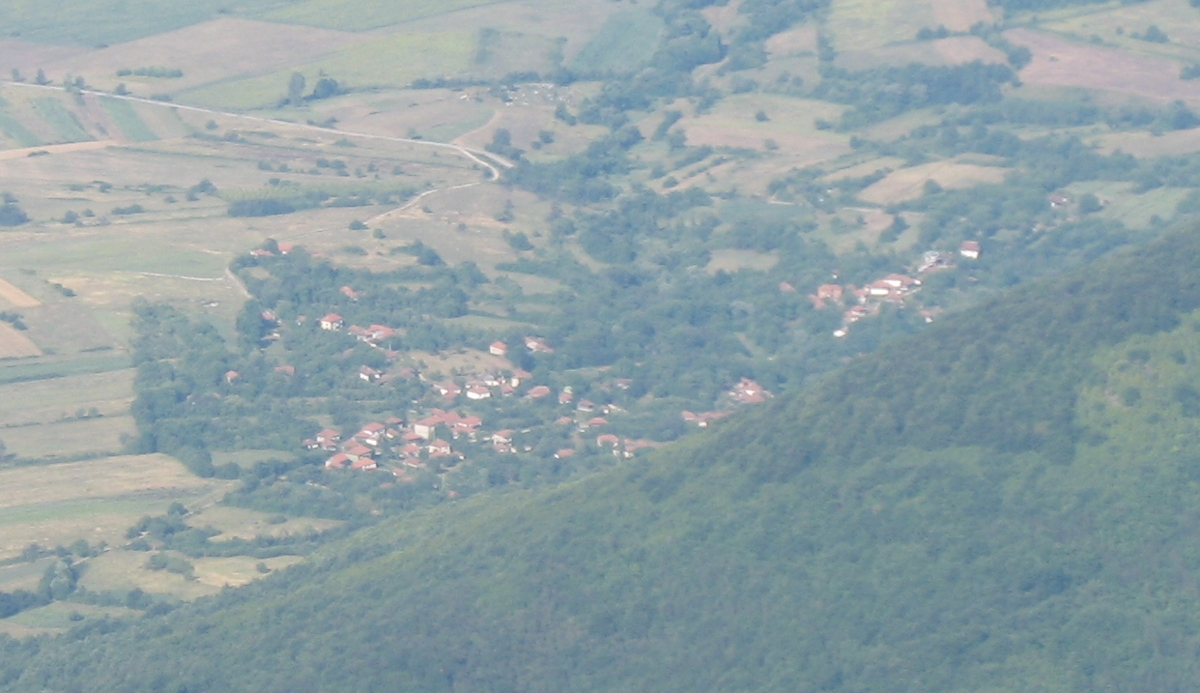
- View of Ilino from the Rtanj mountain
- Interactive map of Ilino
- Coordinates: 43.7977223°N 21.9477524°E
- Country: Serbia
- District: Zaječar District
- Municipality: Boljevac

Population (2011)
  - Total: 105
- Time zone: UTC+1 (CET)
  - Summer (DST): UTC+2 (CEST)

Ilino (Serbian Cyrillic: Илино) is a village in the municipality of Boljevac in eastern Serbia. According to the 2011 census, the village has a population of 105 people.
