= Mirovo =

Coordinates: 43.7978°N 21.9153°E

- Village
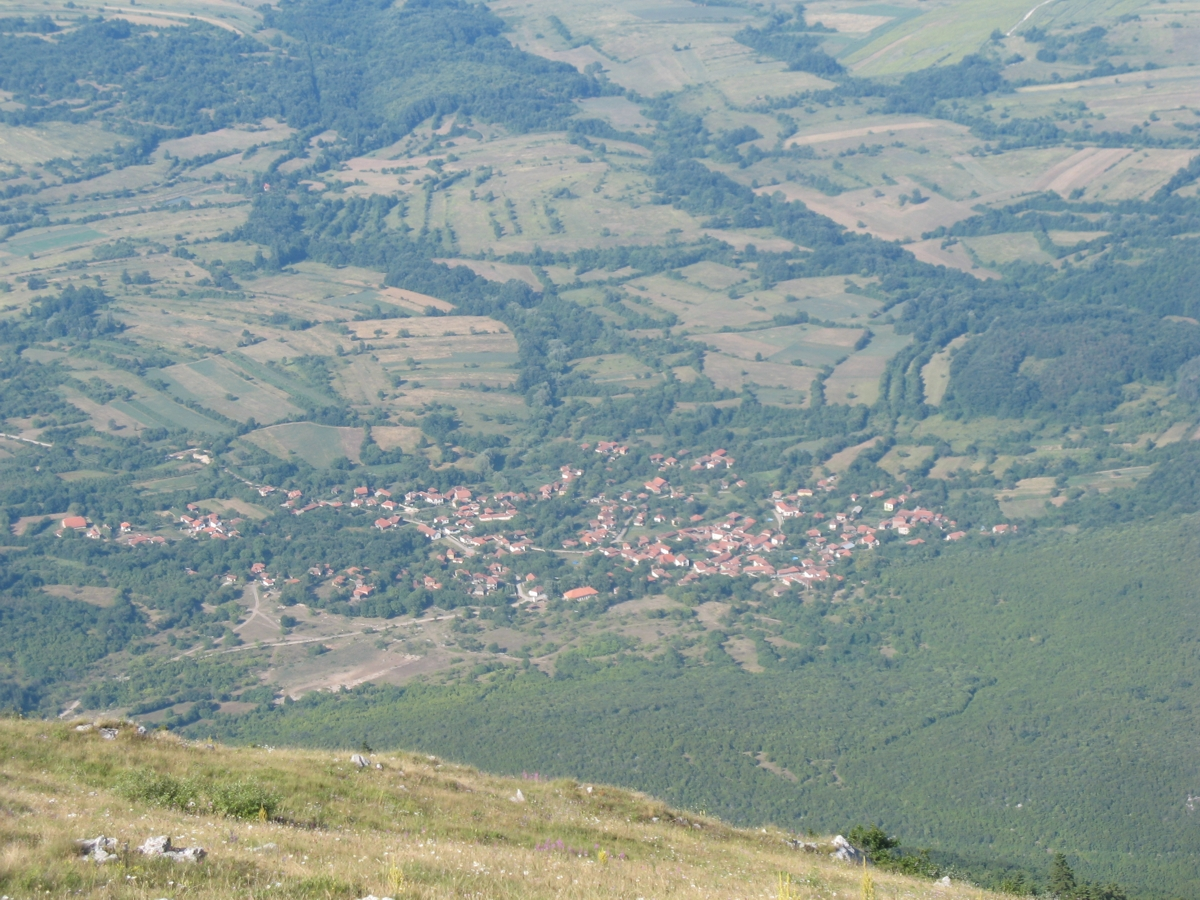
- View on Mirovo from Rtanj mountain, Serbia.
- Interactive map of Mirovo
- Country: Serbia
- District: Zaječar District
- Municipality: Boljevac

Population (2002)
  - Total: 183
- Time zone: UTC+1 (CET)
  - Summer (DST): UTC+2 (CEST)

Mirovo (Serbian Cyrillic: Мирово) is a village in the municipality of Boljevac, Serbia. According to the 2002 census, the village has a population of 183 people.
