= Transitions Online =

Transitions Online (TOL)
- Founded: 1999
- Purpose: Journalism, New Media
- Region served: Central Europe, Eastern Europe, South Eastern Europe, Baltics, Caucasus, Central Asia
- Website: tol.org

Transitions Online (Transitions - formerly TOL) is a media development organization and online journal covering news and events in the 31 post-Communist countries of Eastern Europe, Central Europe, South Eastern Europe, Russia, the Baltics, the Caucasus, Central Asia. It was founded in the Czech Republic in 1999.

== History ==
TOL was founded as a Czech nonprofit organization in April 1999 as a successor to the print magazine, Transitions. With the financial and professional support of the Open Society Institute's (OSI) Internet program and the Media Development Investment Fund (MDIF), the magazine was resurrected online in July 1999. Since then, TOL has worked with up-and-coming journalists from across its target region, providing opportunities for training and professional development.

TOL was the winner of the 2001 NetMedia Award for Outstanding Contribution to Online Journalism in Europe and the 2003 NetMedia Award for Best Innovation in Online Journalism. In 2005, two TOL editors were jointly named among 50 “Europeans of the Year” by the European Voice for the magazine’s coverage of EU integration.

== Training Institute ==
TOL regularly runs commercial and grant-funded training seminars for professional and aspiring journalists on a range of topics, including working as a foreign correspondent, EU reporting, online publishing and new media, and others. In cooperation with the BBC World Trust and The Guardian Foundation, TOL has also launched several distance education courses on environmental reporting, new media, and education reporting. To date, TOL has helped improve the writing and reporting skills of hundreds of journalists from the region.

== Affiliated projects ==
In 2006, TOL and neweurasia teamed up to explore the vast potential of blogging to act as a cost-efficient, powerful instrument of free speech, free press, advocacy, and self-expression in Central Asia. The project showcases bloggers from across Central Asia, in Russian, English and local languages.

Since 2007, Transitions Online has emerged as a leading source of news and analysis on developments in education reform across its target region and other countries in transition. With the support of the Open Society Institute's Education Support Program, TOL has pioneered training in education reporting in post-communist countries and features regular coverage of education themes on its education reporting resource site, Chalkboard.

Transitions Online is also one of the supporters of Social Innovation Camps in Europe and Asia.

== See also ==
- Social Innovation Camp
- Journalism
- Mass media
- New media
- Web 2.0
