= Orljane =

Orljane Орљане
- Village
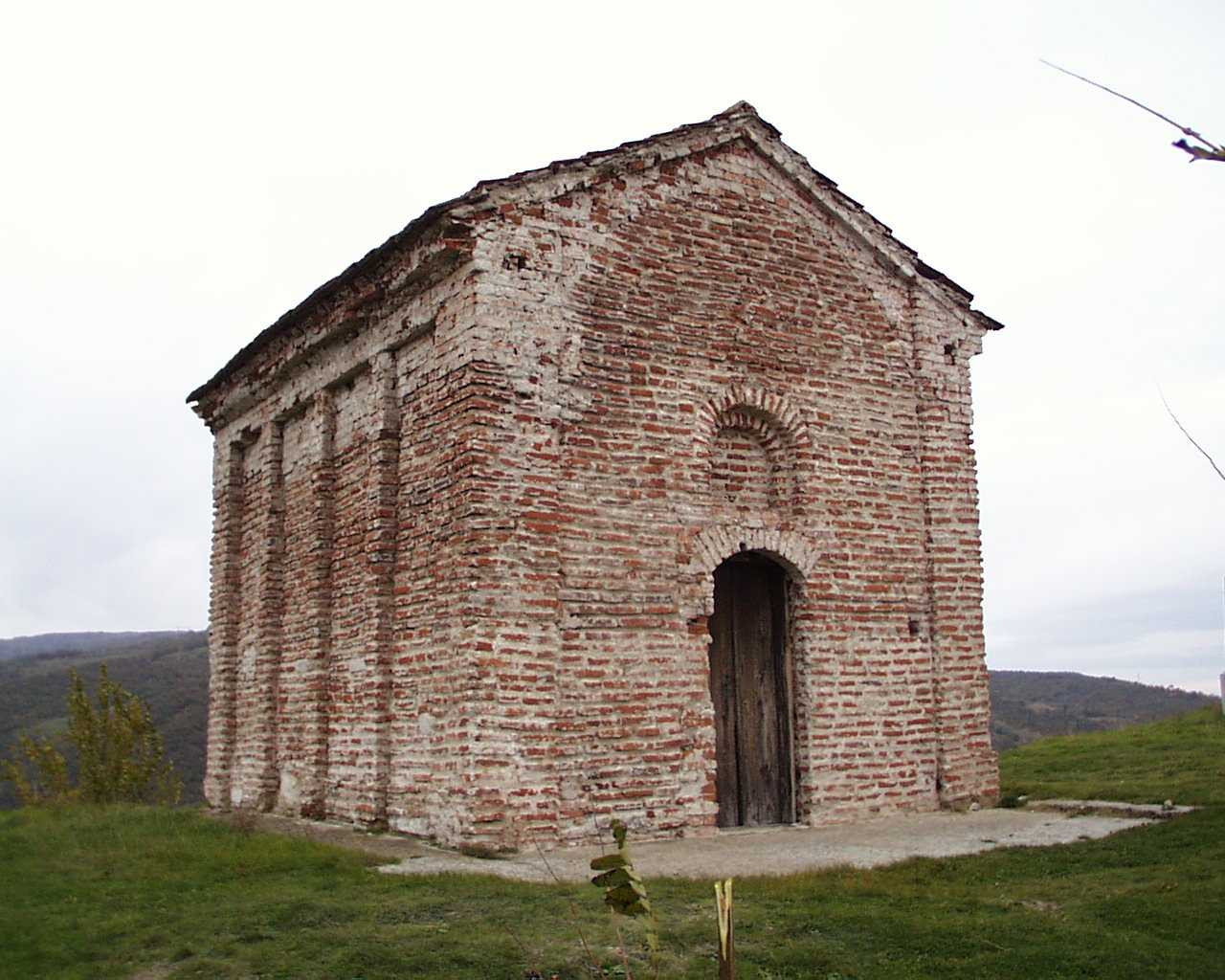

- Location in Serbia
- Coordinates: 43°12′47″N 21°49′08″E
- Country: Serbia
- District: Nišava District
- Municipality: Doljevac

Population (2011)
  - Total: 1,612
- Time zone: UTC+1 (CET)
  - Summer (DST): UTC+2 (CEST)

Orljane is a village situated in Doljevac municipality in Serbia.
