= Social Innovation Camp =

Competition and event for software developers

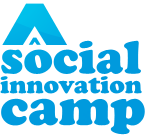
SICamp logo

Social Innovation Camp (SICamp) is a competition and event for software developers, designers and social innovators to create new businesses and projects that use the web to achieve a social goal. It is a method for social innovation.

== History ==
Social Innovation Camp was set up in London, in early 2008, with support from the Young Foundation and NESTA.

Social Innovation Camps have taken place:

- April 2008 at the Young Foundation in Bethnal Green, London.
- December 2008 at the Young Foundation in Bethnal Green, London.
- June 2009 at The Saltire Centre in Glasgow, Scotland.
- 8–10 August 2009 in Tbilisi, Georgia.
- September 2009 in Bratislava, Slovakia.
- 5–7 March 2010 in Sydney, Australia.
- 26–28 March 2010 at the Young Foundation in Bethnal Green, London.
- 18–19 September 2010, Baku, Azerbaijan.
- 17–19 June 2011 in Seoul, South Korea.
- January 2011 in Lagos, Nigeria.
- 12–14 November 2010, Prague, Czech Republic.
- 18–19 September 2010, Lagos, Nigeria.
- 27–29 May 2011, in Kyrgyzstan.
- 18–20 June 2011 at The Informatics Forum in Edinburgh, Scotland.
- 18–20 June 2011 in Seoul, South Korea.
- July 23–24, 2011, Baku, Azerbaijan
- November 18–20, 2011, Yerevan, Armenia.
- May 10–12, 2013, Oslo, Norway.

== Winners ==
- The winning project from the first event was Enabled By Design.
- The winning project from the second camp was The Good Gym.
- The winning project from the third camp was MyPolice.
- The winning projects from the 8th camp were Yollar.info (project about transports in Baku) and Temizsaxlayaq.com (project about environment protection).

== International Camps ==
The Social Innovation Camp model has been replicated in Australia, Slovakia, South Korea, Georgia, Armenia, Czech Republic, Nigeria, Kyrgyzstan and Azerbaijan.

"Transitions Online" organized the Social Innovation Camp in Azerbaijan (July 23–24, 2011). Organisers for International Social Innovation Camps include Open Society Foundations, The Hope Institute, IREX, UNDP, Internews, The Eurasia Partnership Foundation, World Wide Narrative and others.

== Media interest ==
Social Innovation Camps have been featured by a number of media outlets including The Guardian.

== See also ==
- Social Innovation
- Young Foundation
- Transitions Online
