= Tulare, Medveđa =

Tulare Туларе (Serbian)
- Village
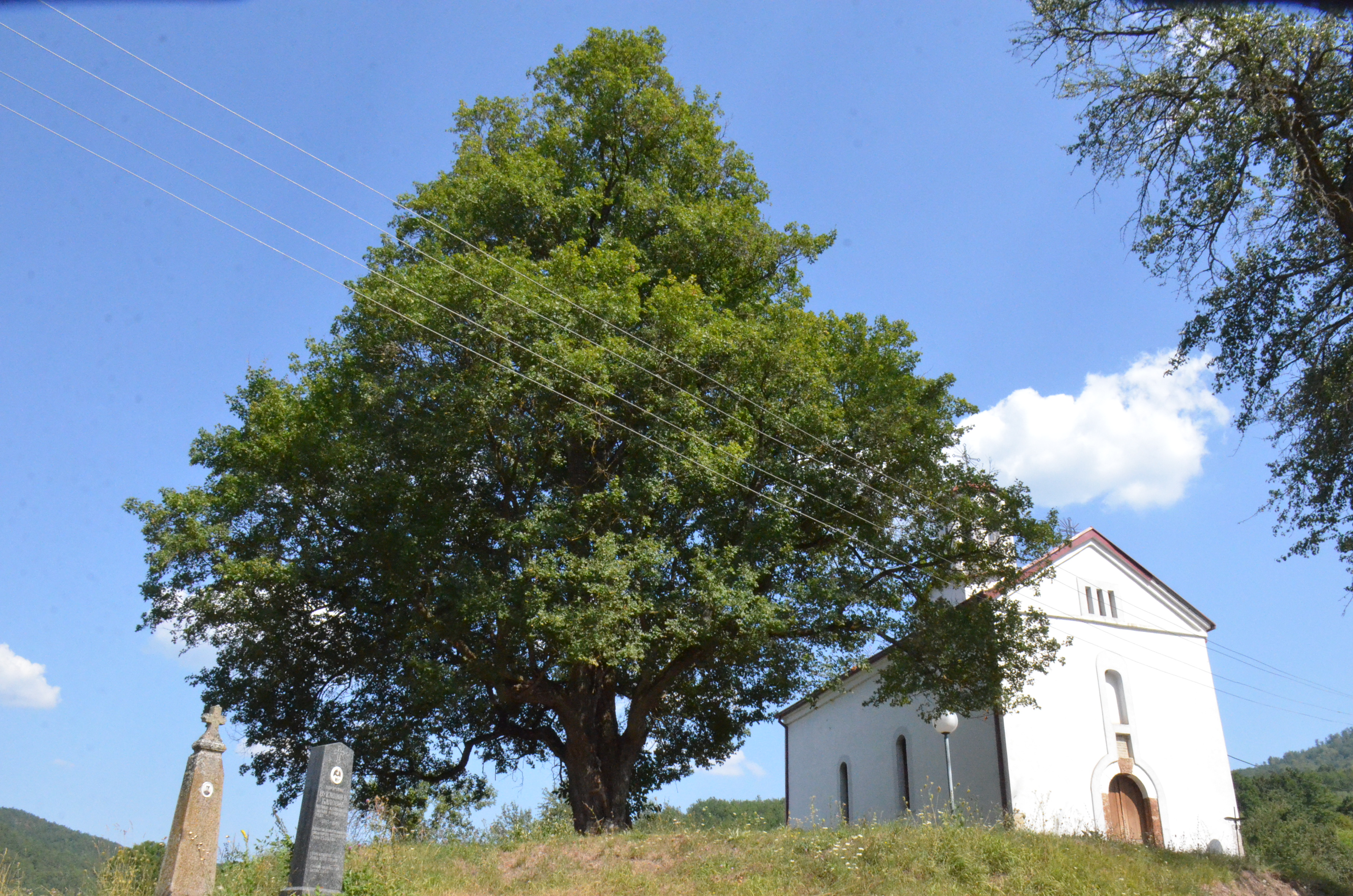

- Location within Serbia
- Coordinates: 42°47′35″N 21°27′32″E
- Country: Serbia
- District: Jablanica District
- Time zone: UTC+1 (CET)
  - Summer (DST): UTC+2 (CEST)

Tulare (Serbian Cyrillic: Туларе) is a village in Serbia. It is located in the Medveđa municipality, in the Jablanica District. According to the 2011 census, Tulare had 161 inhabitants, mostly Serbs.
