= Dobrujevac (Boljevac) =

Dobrujevac Добрујевац
- Village
- Location within Serbia
- Coordinates: 43°48′36″N 21°58′40″E
- Country: Serbia
- District: Zaječar District
- Municipality: Boljevac

Population (2002)
  - Total: 236
- Time zone: UTC+1 (CET)
  - Summer (DST): UTC+2 (CEST)

Dobrujevac (Serbian Cyrillic: Добрујевац) is a village in the municipality of Boljevac, Serbia. According to the 2002 census, the village has a population of 236 people.
