= Jablanica, Boljevac =

Jablanica Јабланица
- Village
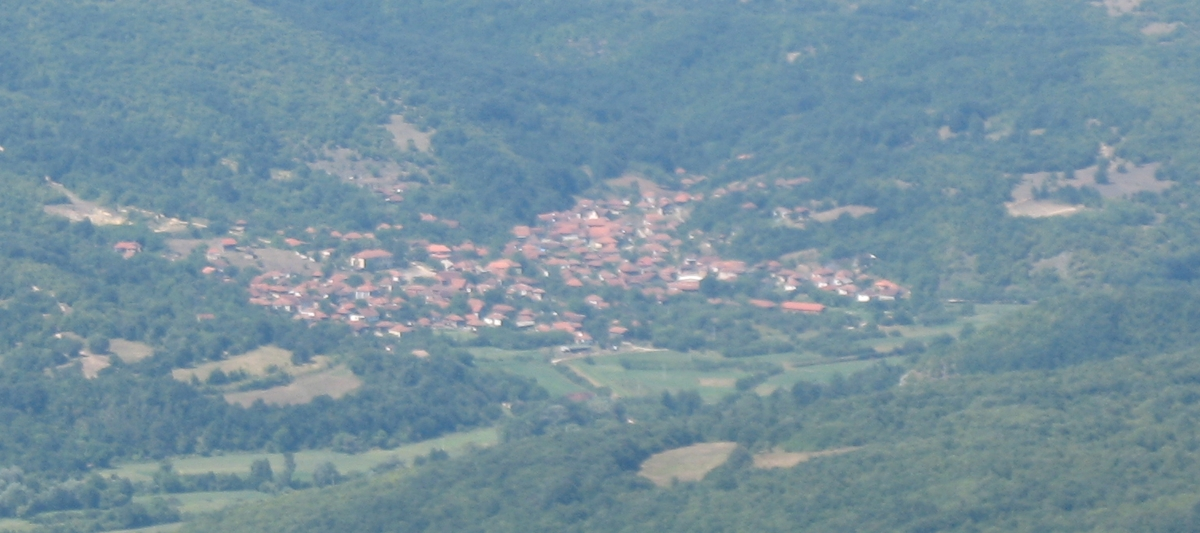
- View on Jablanica from Rtanj

- Location within Serbia
- Coordinates: 43°50′10″N 21°52′00″E
- Country: Serbia
- District: Zaječar District
- Municipality: Boljevac

Population (2002)
  - Total: 435
- Time zone: UTC+1 (CET)
  - Summer (DST): UTC+2 (CEST)

Jablanica (Serbian Cyrillic: Јабланица) is a village in the municipality of Boljevac, Serbia. According to the 2002 census, the village has a population of 435 people.
