= Mali Izvor (Boljevac) =

Mali Izvor Мали Извор
- Village
- Location within Serbia
- Coordinates: 43°51′22″N 21°54′39″E
- Country: Serbia
- District: Zaječar District
- Municipality: Boljevac

Population (2002)
  - Total: 565
- Time zone: UTC+1 (CET)
  - Summer (DST): UTC+2 (CEST)

Mali Izvor (Serbian Cyrillic: Мали Извор) is a village in the municipality of Boljevac, Serbia. According to the 2002 census, the village has a population of 565 people.
