= Krivi Vir =

- Village
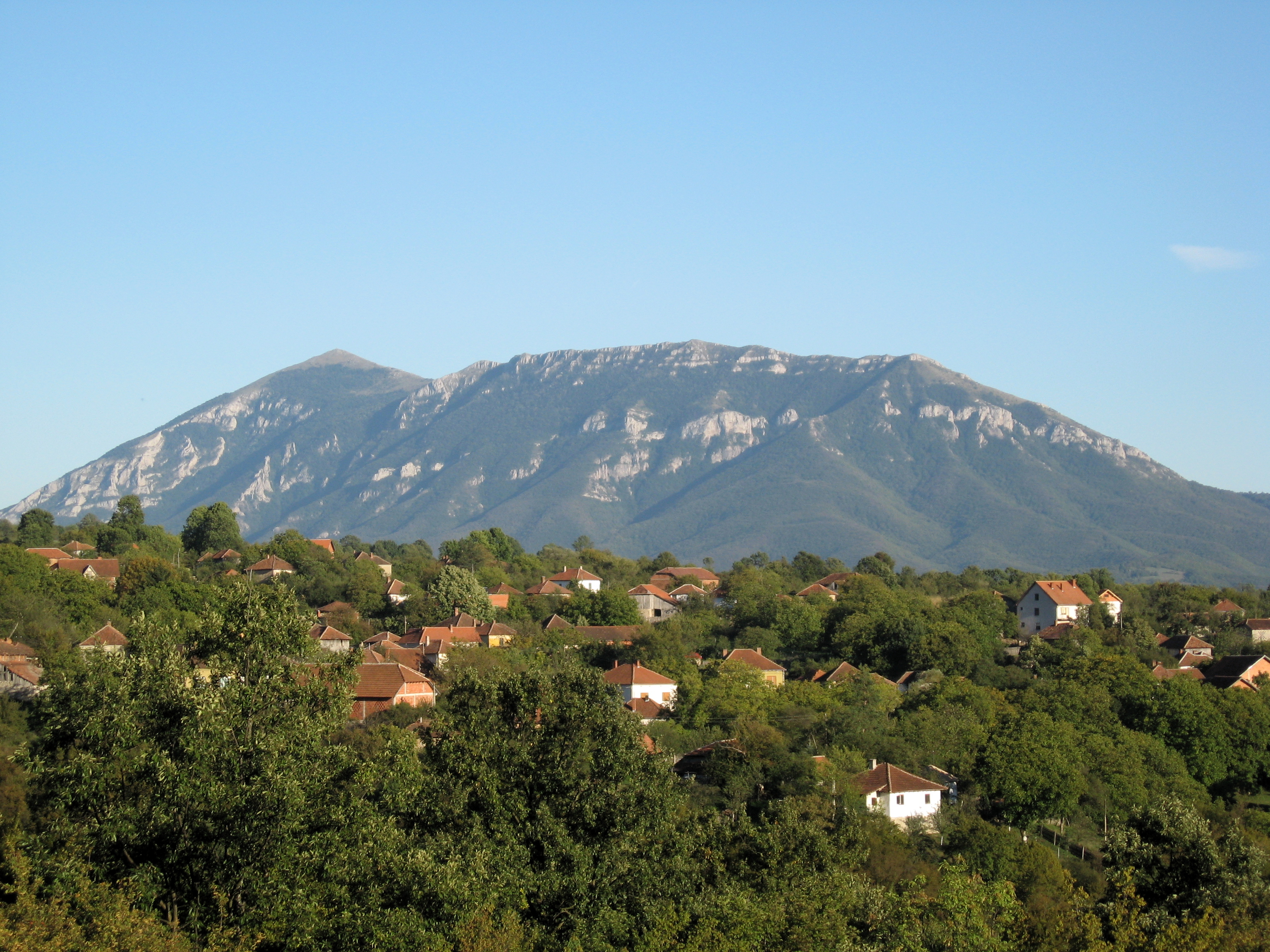

- Location within Serbia
- Coordinates: 43°49′31″N 21°45′05″E
- Country: Serbia
- District: Zaječar District
- Municipality: Boljevac

Population (2002)
  - Total: 549
- Time zone: UTC+1 (CET)
  - Summer (DST): UTC+2 (CEST)

Krivi Vir (Serbian Cyrillic: Криви Вир) is a village in the municipality of Boljevac, Serbia. According to the 2002 census, the village had a population of 549. The village is situated in the Crna Reka region.

The village was a site of operations in the First Serbian Uprising (1804–13). The Crna Reka nahija was organized into Revolutionary Serbia, with a seat at Zaječar and the establishment of a magistrate (court). A Serbian military camp was located at Krivi Vir.

== Sources ==
- Jovanović, Dragoljub K. (1883). "Црна река". Glasnik Srpskog učenog društva. 54: 187–256.
- Nenadović, Konstantin N. (1884). Живот и дела великог Ђорђа Петровића Кара-Ђорђа. Vol. II (1 ed.). Vienna: У Штампарији Јована Н. Вернаја – via Google Books.
- Protić, Kosta (1893). "Ратни догађаји из првога српског устанка под Карађорђем Петровићем 1804—1813". Годишњица Николе Чупића. XIII. Državna štamparija.
