= Banjska River =

- Native name: Бањска река (Serbian)

Location
- Country: Serbia

Physical characteristics
- Mouth
  - location: Toplica
  - coordinates: 43.1378°N 21.2767°E

Basin features
- Progression: Toplica→ South Morava→ Great Morava→ Danube→ Black Sea

The Banjska River (Serbian: Бањска река, romanized: Banjska reka, lit. 'Baths River') is a river in southern Serbia, the right tributary of Toplica in which it flows near Kuršumlija. It rises under the far south-eastern branch of Kopaonik. It is 22 km long, with a river basin area of 155 km². The average flow at the mouth is 0,7 m³/s. The valley of the river is mostly ravines, while the basin is rich in forest. The Kuršumlija-Kuršumlijska Banja-Prepolac Pass-Podujevo-Priština road leads by that valley.
