= Malča =

Malča Малча
- Village
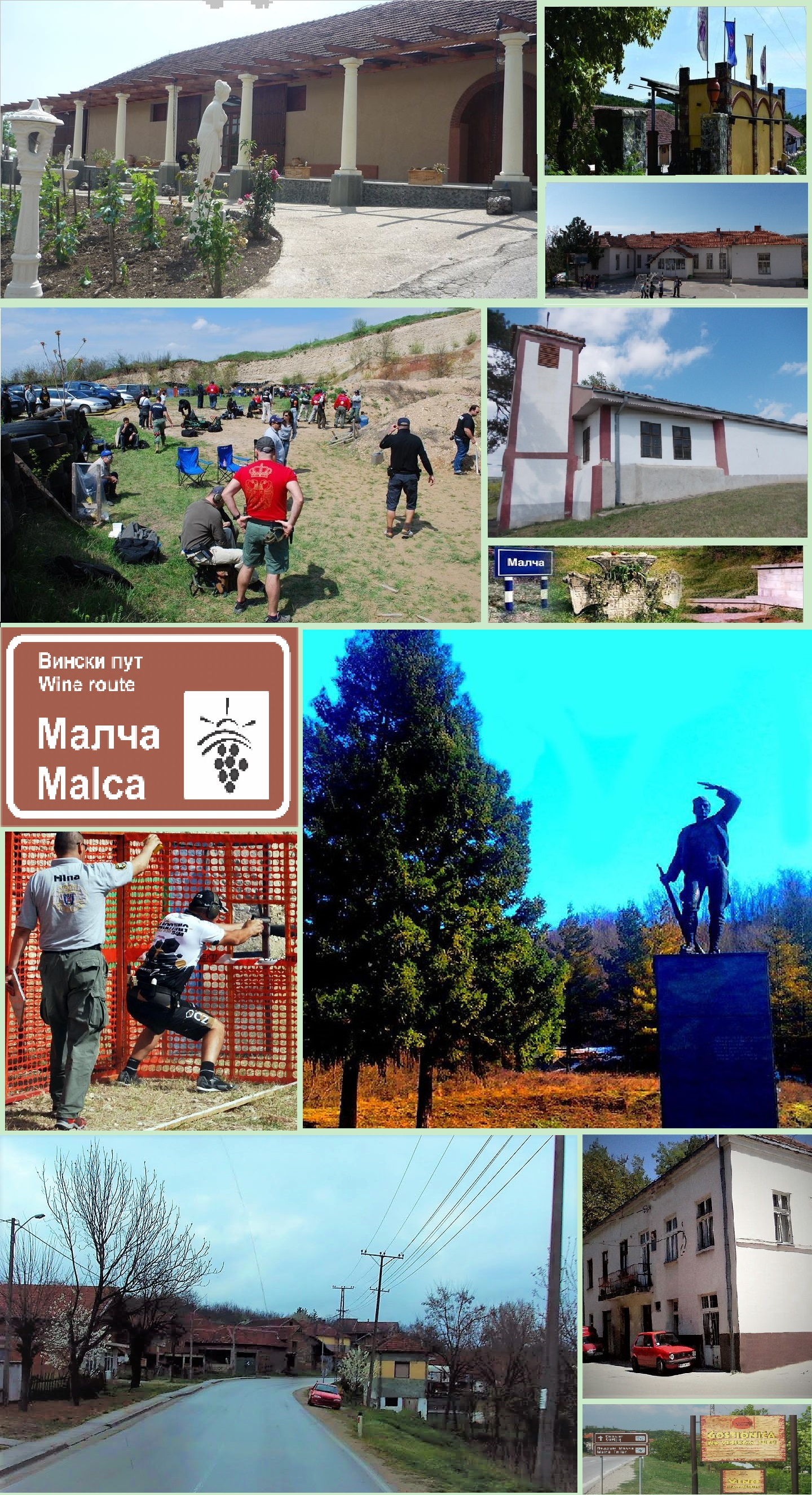
- Collage of Malča

- Location within Serbia
- Country: Serbia
- Region: Southern and Eastern Serbia
- District: Nišava
- City: Niš
- Municipality: Pantelej

Area
  - Total: 14.60 km^{2} (5.64 sq mi)
- Elevation: 388 m (1,273 ft)

Population (2011)
  - Total: 1,030
  - Density: 70.5/km^{2} (183/sq mi)
- Time zone: UTC+1 (CET)
  - Summer (DST): UTC+2 (CEST)

Malča (Serbian Cyrillic: Малча) is a village located in the Niš city municipality of Pantelej, Serbia. As of 2011 census, it has a population of 1,030 inhabitants.
