= Bratmilovce =

- suburban area
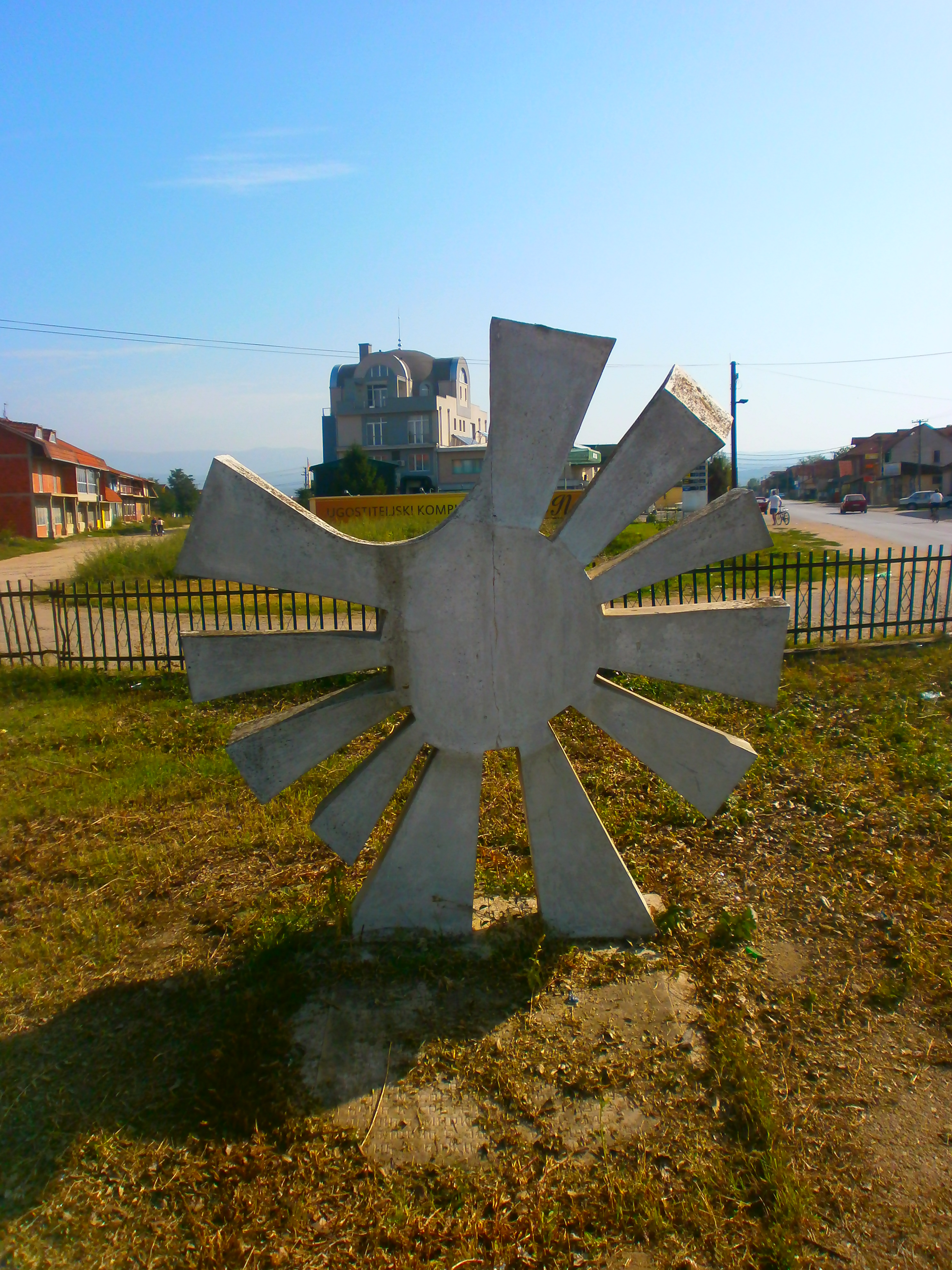

- Location within Serbia
- Coordinates: 43°03′40″N 21°59′16″E
- Country: Serbia
- District: Jablanica District
- Municipality: Leskovac

Population (2002)
  - Total: 3,531
- Time zone: UTC+1 (CET)
  - Summer (DST): UTC+2 (CEST)

Bratmilovce is a suburban area in the municipality of Leskovac, Serbia. According to the 2002 census, the town has a population of 3531 people.
