= Lukovo (Boljevac) =

Lukovo Луково
- Village
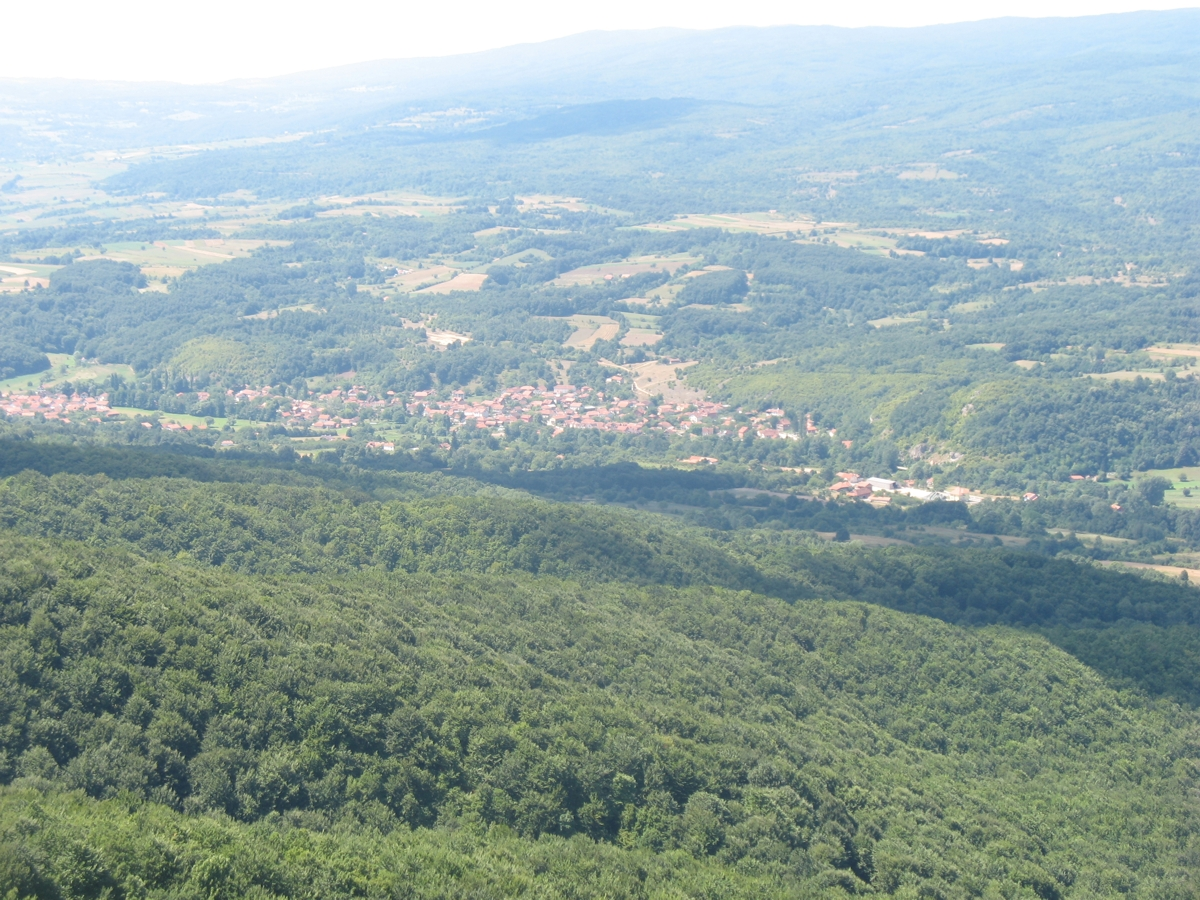
- View on Lukovo from Rtanj
- Motto: Kruševeni Erzfeind Nummer 1
- Interactive map of Lukovo
- Coordinates: 43.802679°N 21.841525°E
- Country: Serbia
- District: Zaječar District
- Municipality: Boljevac

Population (2002)
  - Total: 704
- Time zone: UTC+1 (CET)
  - Summer (DST): UTC+2 (CEST)

Lukovo (Serbian Cyrillic: Луково) is a village in the municipality of Boljevac, Serbia. According to the 2002 census, the village has a population of 704 people. The village is situated in the Crna Reka region.

The village was a site of operations in the First Serbian Uprising (1804–13). The Crna Reka nahija was organized into Revolutionary Serbia, with a seat at Zaječar and the establishment of a magistrate (court). A Serbian military camp was located at Lukovo.

== Sources ==
- Jovanović, Dragoljub K. (1883). "Црна река". Glasnik Srpskog učenog društva. 54: 187–256.
- Nenadović, Konstantin N. (1884). Живот и дела великог Ђорђа Петровића Кара-Ђорђа. Vol. II (1 ed.). Vienna: У Штампарији Јована Н. Вернаја – via Google Books.
- Protić, Kosta (1893). "Ратни догађаји из првога српског устанка под Карађорђем Петровићем 1804—1813". Годишњица Николе Чупића. XIII. Državna štamparija.
