= Beloljin =

Beloljin Белољин (Serbian)
- Village
- Location within Serbia
- Coordinates: 43°14′14″N 21°23′43″E
- Country: Serbia
- District: Toplica District
- Municipality: Prokuplje

Population (2002)
  - Total: 569
- Time zone: UTC+1 (CET)
  - Summer (DST): UTC+2 (CEST)

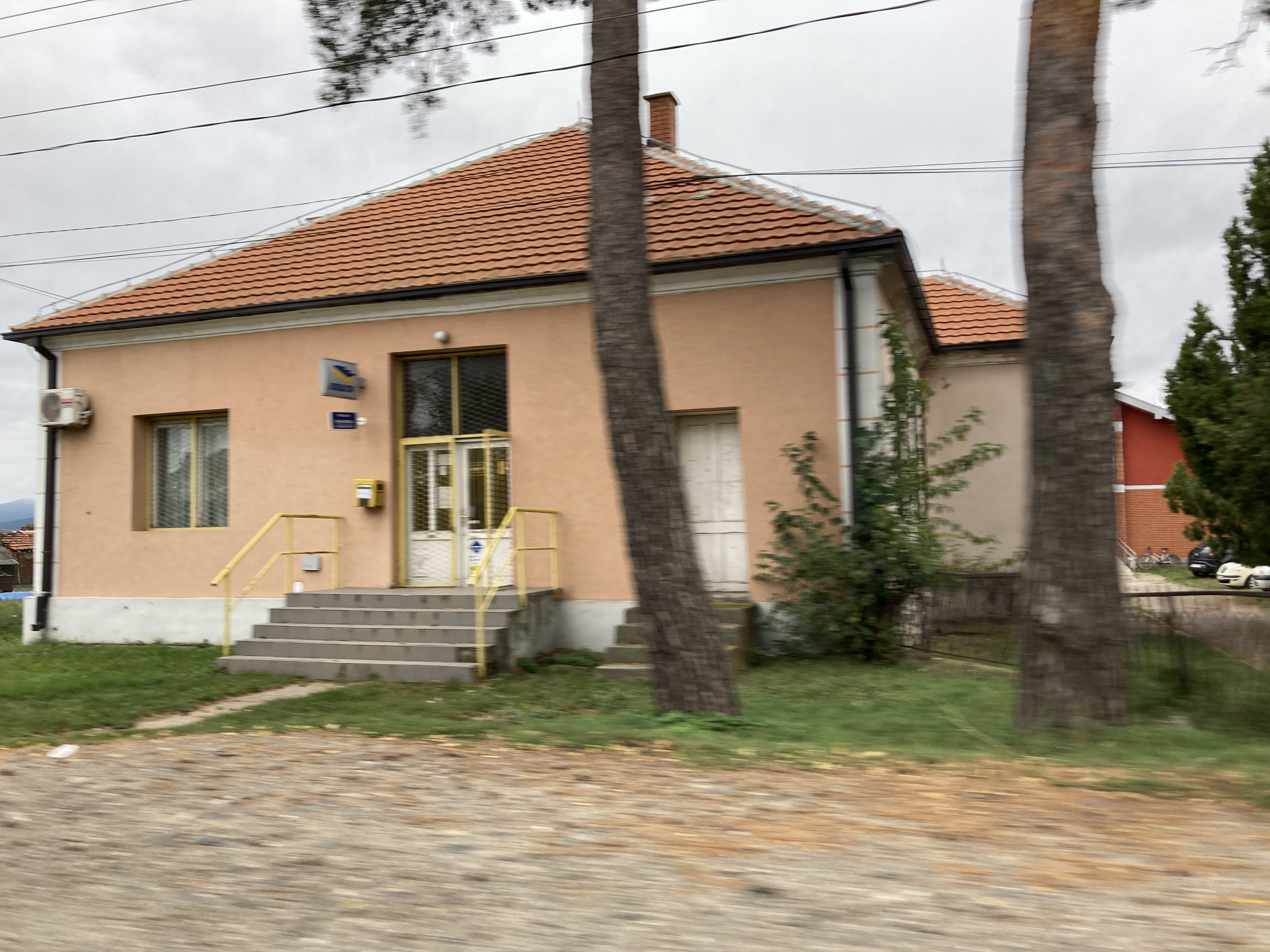
Beloljin post office, Prokuplje municipality

Beloljin (Serbian: Белољин), formerly Belonjin (Белоњин), is a village in the municipality of Prokuplje, Serbia. According to the 2002 census, the village has a population of 569 people.
