= Boljevac =

Boljevac Бољевац (Serbian) Bulioț (Romanian)
- Town and municipality
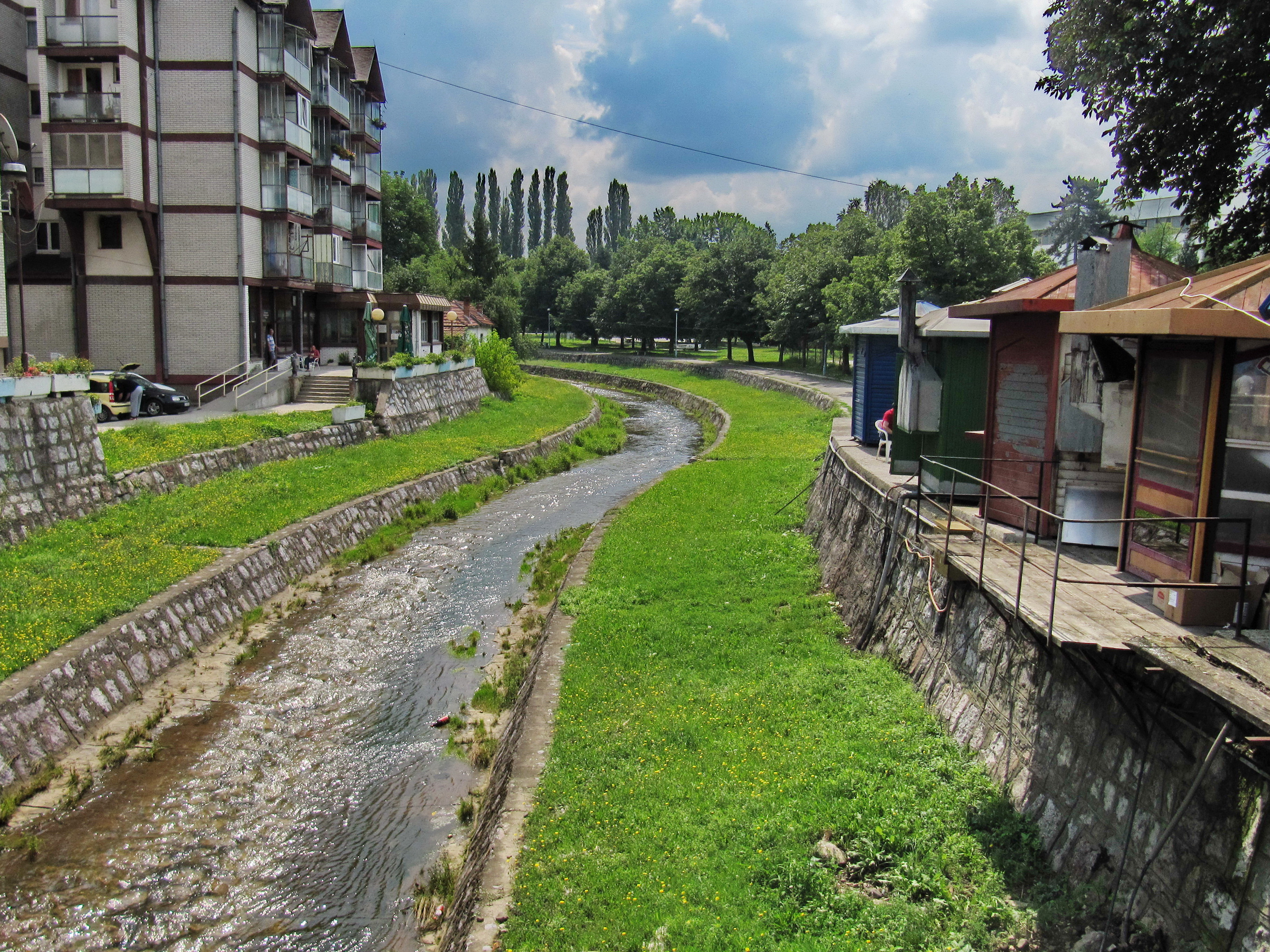

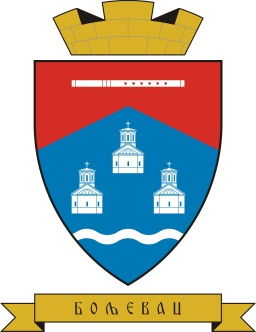
- Coat of arms

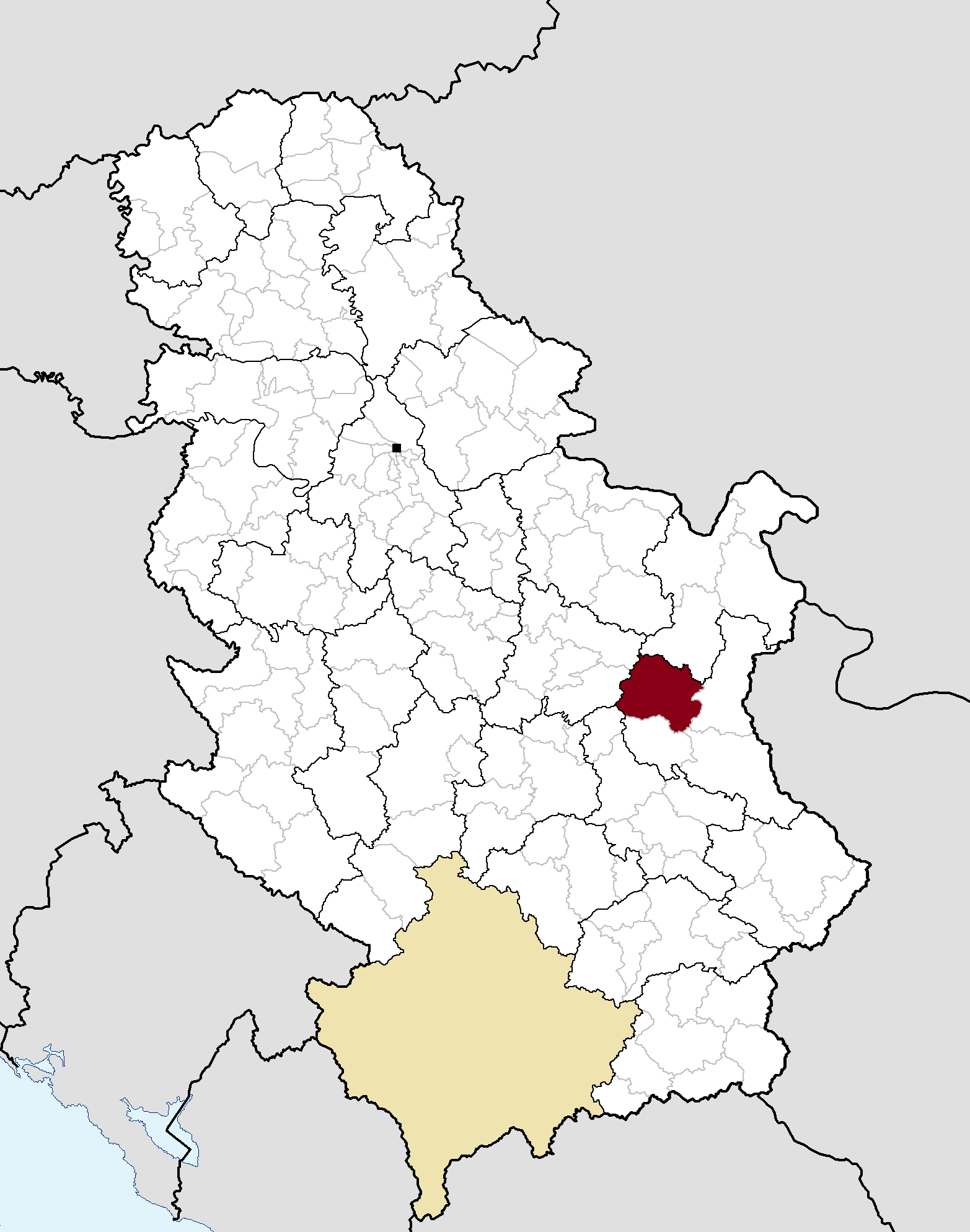
- Location of the municipality of Boljevac within Serbia
- Coordinates: 43°49′49.08″N 21°57′11.16″E
- Country: Serbia
- Region: Southern and Eastern Serbia
- District: Zaječar
- Settlements: 20

Government
  - Mayor: Nebojša Marjanović (SNS)

Area
  - Municipality: 828 km^{2} (320 sq mi)
- Elevation: 263 m (863 ft)

Population (2022 census)
  - Town: 2,894
  - Municipality: 10,184
- Time zone: UTC+1 (CET)
  - Summer (DST): UTC+2 (CEST)
- Postal code: 19370
- Area code: +381(0)30
- Car plates: ZA
- Website: www.boljevac.org.rs

Boljevac (Serbian Cyrillic: Бољевац, pronounced [bɔ̌ːʎɛʋat͡s]) is a town and municipality located in the Zaječar District of eastern Serbia. According to 2022 census, the population of the town was 2,894, while population of the municipality was 10,184. The area is situated in the Crna Reka region.

== History ==
From 1929 to 1941, Boljevac was part of the Morava Banovina of the Kingdom of Yugoslavia.

In 2010, the Commission on Concealed Mass Graves in Serbia discovered a mass grave of people killed by Yugoslav Partisans during World War II in the settlement of Zmijanac. Partisan troops took over the municipality in October 1944. They subsequently executed over 40 locals, including a priest of the Serbian Orthodox Church.

== Settlements ==
Aside from the town of Boljevac, the municipality of consists of the following villages:

- Bačevica
- Bogovina
- Boljevac Selo
- Valakonje
- Vrbovac
- Dobro Polje
- Dobrujevac
- Ilino
- Jablanica
- Krivi Vir
- Lukovo
- Mali Izvor
- Mirovo
- Osnić
- Podgorac
- Rtanj
- Rujište
- Savinac
- Sumrakovac

== Demographics ==
Historical population
Year	Pop.	±% p.a.
1948	25,423	—
1953	25,831	+0.32%
1961	26,277	+0.21%
1971	23,335	−1.18%
1981	21,818	−0.67%
1991	19,384	−1.18%
2002	15,849	−1.81%
2011	12,994	−2.18%
2022	10,184	−2.19%

As of 2022 census, the municipality has 10,184 inhabitants. Of those, there are 7,089 (69.61%) Serbs, 1,634 (16.04%) Vlachs, 236 (2.32%) Romani and others.

== Economy ==
The following table gives a preview of total number of employed people per their core activity (as of 2017):

Activity	Total
Agriculture, forestry and fishing	128
Mining	260
Processing industry	372
Distribution of power, gas and water	22
Distribution of water and water waste management	26
Construction	45
Wholesale and retail, repair	244
Traffic, storage and communication	69
Hotels and restaurants	38
Media and telecommunications	20
Finance and insurance	21
Property stock and charter	-
Professional, scientific, innovative and technical activities	24
Administrative and other services	28
Administration and social assurance	153
Education	175
Healthcare and social work	116
Art, leisure and recreation	8
Other services	22
Total	1,774

== Twin cities ==
- Kavadarci, North Macedonia

== See also ==
- List of populated places in Serbia
