= Valakonje =

- Village
- Location within Serbia
- Coordinates: 43°52′08″N 21°58′41″E
- Country: Serbia
- District: Zaječar District
- Municipality: Boljevac

Population (2022)
  - Total: 806
- Time zone: UTC+1 (CET)
  - Summer (DST): UTC+2 (CEST)

Valakonje (Serbian Cyrillic: Валакоње) is a village in the municipality of Boljevac, Serbia. According to the 2022 census, the village has a population of 806 people.
