= Krivača (Lebane) =

Krivača Кривача (Serbian)
- Village
- Location within Serbia
- Coordinates: 42°55′26″N 21°43′00″E
- Country: Serbia
- District: Jablanica District
- Municipality: Lebane

Population (2002)
  - Total: 414
- Time zone: UTC+1 (CET)
  - Summer (DST): UTC+2 (CEST)

Krivača is a village in the municipality of Lebane, Serbia. According to the 2002 census, the village has a population of 414 people.
