= Štipina =

- Village
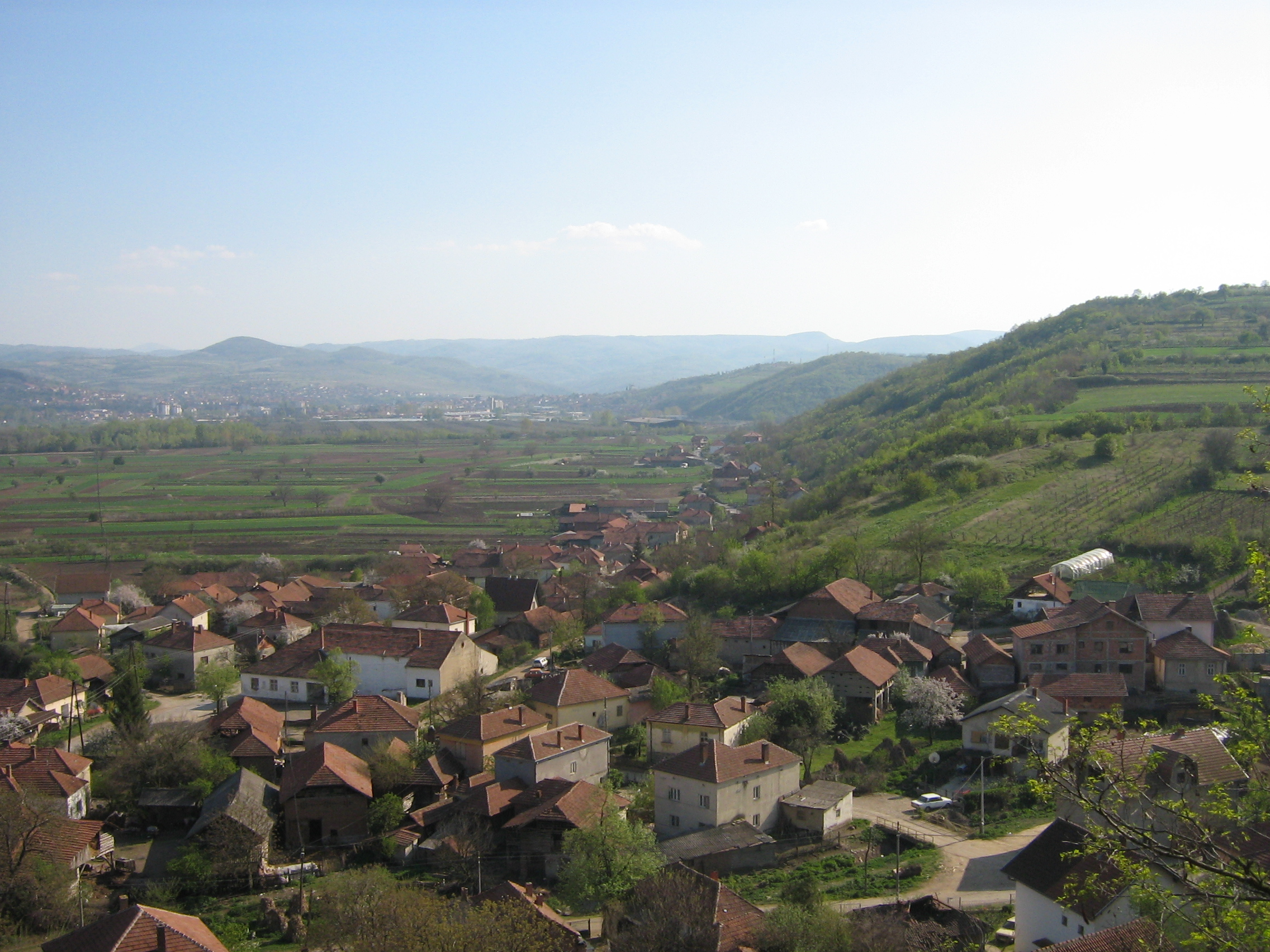

- Location within Serbia
- Coordinates: 43°36′04″N 22°14′42″E
- Country: Serbia
- District: Zaječar District
- Municipality: Knjaževac

Population (2002)
  - Total: 531
- Time zone: UTC+1 (CET)
  - Summer (DST): UTC+2 (CEST)

Štipina is a village in the municipality of Knjaževac, Serbia. According to the 2002 census, the village has a population of 531 people.
