= Skrobnica =

- Village
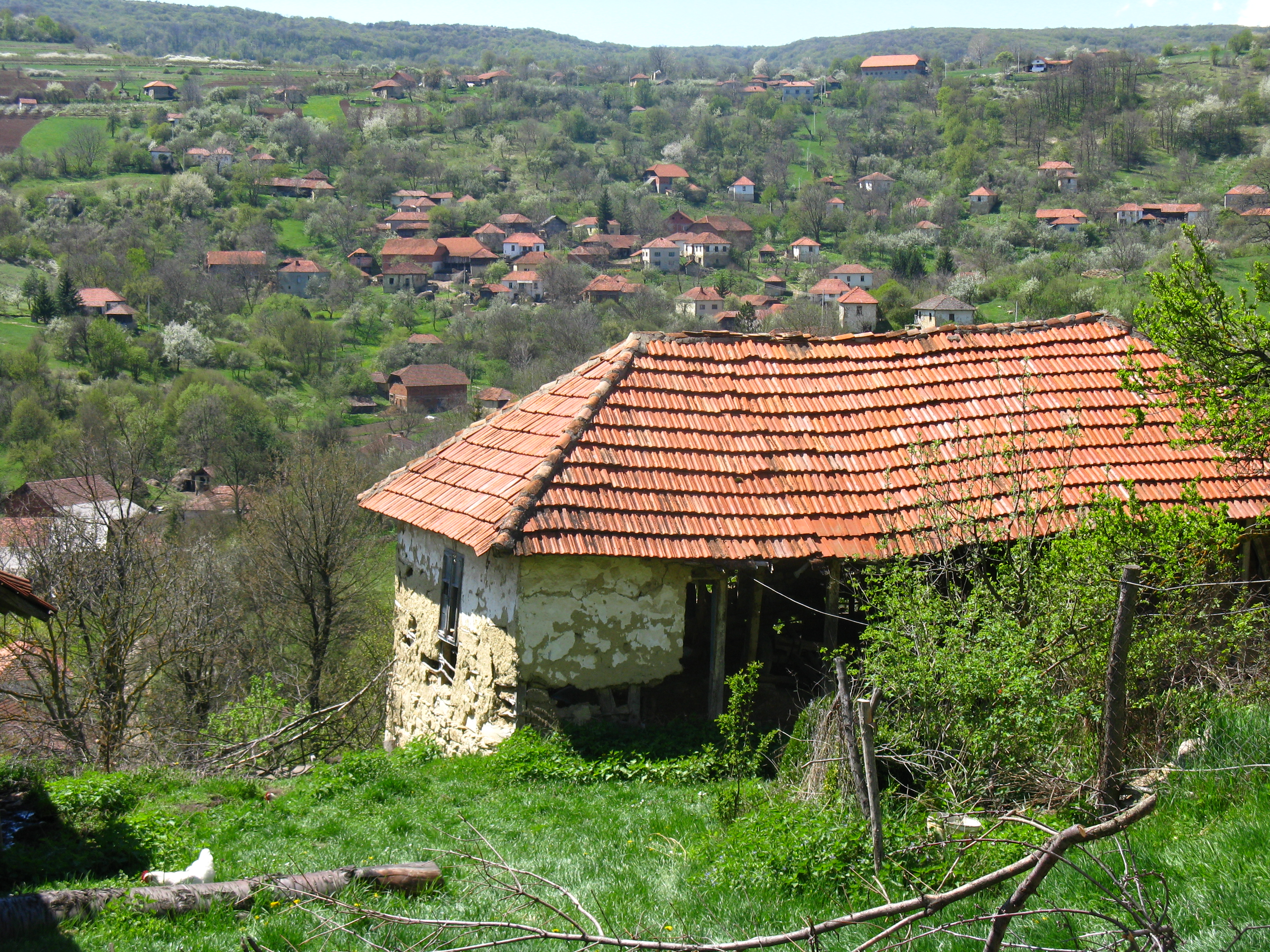

- Location within Serbia
- Coordinates: 43°34′30″N 22°03′12″E
- Country: Serbia
- District: Zaječar District
- Municipality: Knjaževac

Population (2002)
  - Total: 178
- Time zone: UTC+1 (CET)
  - Summer (DST): UTC+2 (CEST)

Skrobnica is a village in the municipality of Knjaževac, Serbia. According to the 2002 census, the village has a population of 178 people.
