= Novo Korito =

- Village
- Location within Serbia
- Coordinates: 43°38′20″N 22°26′38″E
- Country: Serbia
- District: Zaječar District
- Municipality: Knjaževac

Population (2002)
  - Total: 208
- Time zone: UTC+1 (CET)
  - Summer (DST): UTC+2 (CEST)

Novo Korito is a village in the municipality of Knjaževac, Serbia. According to the 2002 census, the village has a population of 208 people. And according to finding in 2011, 126
