= Aldina Reka =

- Village
- Location within Serbia
- Coordinates: 43°27′07″N 22°31′01″E
- Country: Serbia
- District: Zaječar District
- Municipality: Knjaževac

Population (2011)
  - Total: 0
- Time zone: UTC+1 (CET)
  - Summer (DST): UTC+2 (CEST)

Aldina Reka (Serbian: Алдина Река) is a village in the municipality of Knjaževac, Serbia. According to the 2011 census, a lone person populates the village. 2002 there were still 12 inhabitants. According to the 2022 census, there were no inhabitants. Its population peaked in the 1960s, with 396 living in the village according to the 1961 census.
