= Banjski Orešac =

- Village
- Location within Serbia
- Coordinates: 43°37′42″N 22°04′28″E
- Country: Serbia
- District: Zaječar District
- Municipality: Knjaževac

Population (2002)
  - Total: 96
- Time zone: UTC+1 (CET)
  - Summer (DST): UTC+2 (CEST)

Banjski Orešac is a village in the municipality of Knjaževac, Serbia. According to the 2002 census, the village has a population of 96 people.

== Population ==
According to census data, the population has been in a decline since at least 1948:

1948	1953	1961	1971	1981	1991	2002
356	350	323	311	247	154	96
