= Valevac =

- Village
- Location within Serbia
- Coordinates: 43°37′18″N 22°12′44″E
- Country: Serbia
- District: Zaječar District
- Municipality: Knjaževac

Population (2002)
  - Total: 281
- Time zone: UTC+1 (CET)
  - Summer (DST): UTC+2 (CEST)

Valevac is a village in the municipality of Knjaževac, Serbia. At the 2002 census, its population was 281.
