= Balanovac =

- Village
- Location within Serbia
- Coordinates: 43°35′07″N 22°09′57″E
- Country: Serbia
- District: Zaječar District
- Municipality: Knjaževac

Population (2002)
  - Total: 328
- Time zone: UTC+1 (CET)
  - Summer (DST): UTC+2 (CEST)

Balanovac is a village in the municipality of Knjaževac, Serbia. In 2002, it had a population of 328.
