= Ovidia gens =

Family in ancient Rome

The gens Ovidia was a plebeian family of ancient Rome. Only a few members of this gens are mentioned in history, of whom the most famous is unquestionably the poet Publius Ovidius Naso, but others are known from inscriptions.

== Origin ==
In his Tristia, Ovid explains that he was descended from an ancient family of equestrian rank, but only moderate wealth. He was born at Sulmo, in the country of the Paeligni, an Oscan-speaking people of central Italy, related to the Sabines and Samnites. The nomen Ovidius would seem to belong to a class of gentilicia formed from other names using the common name-forming suffix -idius, in which case it might be a patronymic surname based on the Oscan praenomen Ovius. Alternatively, the name might have been derived from a cognomen Ovis, referring to a sheep. Chase also mentions a nomen Ofidius, an orthographic variant of Aufidius, derived from the river Aufidus; Ovidius could perhaps be another orthography.

== Praenomina ==
The praenomina found most frequently among the Ovidii are Lucius and Gaius, although they also used Quintus, Marcus, Publius, and in at least one instance, Titus. These were the most common names throughout Roman history.

== Branches and cognomina ==
The only important surname of the Ovidii was Naso, borne by the poet. This was a relatively common cognomen, describing someone with a large or prominent nose, although it is not known whether Ovid himself had such a feature, or whether the surname was originally bestowed upon one of his ancestors.

== Members ==
This list includes abbreviated praenomina. For an explanation of this practice, see filiation.

- Lucius Ovidius, the elder brother of Ovid, died at the age of twenty.
- Publius Ovidius Naso ("Ovid"), the poet, was trained as an orator, like his brother, and for a time pleaded in the law courts, before becoming one of the triumviri capitales, and subsequently one of the centumviri, then one of the decemviri stlitibus judicandis, both important judicial appointments. In AD 8, he was exiled by Augustus for reasons that remain mysterious.
- Quintus Ovidius, a dear friend of the poet Martial, who owned a neighboring estate at Nomentum, where both produced wine. When Maximus Caesonius was banished by Nero, Ovidius followed his friend into exile. Later, Martial laments Ovidius' impending travel to Caledonia, and hopes he will return to Italy in his old age.
- Albius Ovidius Juventinus, the author of Elegia de Philomela, a poem consisting of thirty-five distichs (Note: A type of couplet.) describing the sounds made by various animals. He may have lived at the time of Geta.
- Ovidius L. f., buried at Manerbio in the province of Venetia and Histria.
- Gaius Ovidius C. f., buried at Manerbio.
- Gaius Ovidius C. f. C. n., buried at Aquileia in Venetia and Histria, together with his brothers Lucius, Quintus, and Titus.
- Lucius Ovidius, buried at Manerbio.
- Lucius Ovidius C. f. C. n., buried at Aquileia, together with his brothers Gaius, Quintus, and Titus.
- Lucius Ovidius L. f., dedicated a monument at Sulmo to his wife Septimia Griphilla.
- Marcus Ovidius M. f., named in a list of men from Rome, most of whom are identified as freedmen, although Ovidius is not.
- Quintus Ovidius C. f., the father of Gaius, Lucius, Quintus, and Titus, named in an inscription from Aquileia, dating from the first quarter of the first century BC.
- Quintus Ovidius C. f. C. n., buried at Aquileia with his brothers, Gaius, Lucius, and Titus.
- Titus Ovidius C. f. C. n., buried at Aquileia with his brothers, Gaius, Lucius, and Quintus.
- Publius Ovidius Aemilianus, dedicated a monument to his wife at Ammaedara in Africa Proconsularis.
- Flavius Ovidius Apthonus, a senator and man of consular rank, named in an inscription from Cirta in Numidia, dating from AD 337 to 342.
- Gaius Ovidius C. f. Capito, son of Ovidia Thallusa, buried at Rome, aged twenty-two years, one month, and twenty-five days.
- Gaius Ovidius Cupitus, dedicated a monument in Africa Proconsularis to Ovidia Sancta.
- Lucius Ovidius L. l. Hilarus, a freedman named in an inscription from Rome.
- Ovidia Laïs, wife of Quintus Ovidius Marcio, buried at Nemausus in Gallia Narbonensis.
- Quintus Ovidius Marcio, husband of Ovidia Laïs, buried at Nemausus.
- Lucius Ovidius L. l. Plocamus, a freedman named in an inscription from Rome.
- Lucius Ovidius Priscus, named in an inscription from Cornacum in Pannonia Inferior, dating from AD 61.
- Ovidia Prudentilla, wife of Titus Julius Saturninus, a Decurion in the Cohors II Aurelia Dardanorum, one of the auxiliary cohorts. Buried at Timacum Minus in Moesia Superior.
- Ovidia C. l. Quarta, a freedwoman who dedicated a monument to her sister at Corfinium in Samnium.
- Ovidia L. f. Sancta, perhaps the niece of Gaius Ovidius Cupitus, (Note: Her filiation names her father, Lucius, but the funerary inscription was made by Gaius Ovidius Cupidus, and refers to a most faithful daughter.) buried in Africa Proconsularis, aged fourteen.
- Ovidius Telesphorus, buried at Rome, aged twenty.
- Ovidia Tertulla, the wife of Caecilius Rufus, a military tribune in the first legion. Their daughter was buried at Brigetio in Pannonia Superior.
- Ovidia Thallusa, dedicated a monument at Rome to her son, Gaius Ovidius Capito.
- Lucius Ovidius Veiento, one of the aediles at Pompeii.
- Marcus Ovidius Veiento, mentioned in an inscription from Pompeii.
- Lucius Ovidius L. f. Ventrio, served as military tribune, prefectus fabrum, and one of the quattuorviri at Sulmo, where he was buried.
- Gaius Ovidius C. l. Zenophilus, a freedman buried at Rome.

== See also ==
- List of Roman gentes

== Bibliography ==
- Publius Ovidius Naso (Ovid), Tristia.
- Lucius Annaeus Seneca (Seneca the Elder), Controversiae.
- Pieter Burmann, Anthologia Latina (Latin Anthology), ed. Wernsdorf, (1759–1778).
- Johann Christian Wernsdorf, Poëtae Latini Minores (Minor Latin Poets), Altenburg, Helmstedt (1780–1799).
- Dictionary of Greek and Roman Biography and Mythology, William Smith, ed., Little, Brown and Company, Boston (1849).
- Theodor Mommsen et alii, Corpus Inscriptionum Latinarum (The Body of Latin Inscriptions, abbreviated CIL), Berlin-Brandenburgische Akademie der Wissenschaften (1853–present).
- Giovanni Battista de Rossi, Inscriptiones Christianae Urbis Romanae Septimo Saeculo Antiquiores (Christian Inscriptions from Rome of the First Seven Centuries, abbreviated ICUR), Vatican Library, Rome (1857–1861, 1888).
- Gottfried Bernhardy, Grundriss der Römischen Litteratur (Outline of Roman Literature), C. A. Schwetschke und Sohn, Brunswick (Fifth Edition, 1872).
- Notizie degli Scavi di Antichità (News of Excavations from Antiquity, abbreviated NSA), Accademia dei Lincei (1876–present).
- Mélanges d'Archéologie et d'Histoire de l'École Française de Rome (Archaeological and Historical Collections of the French School at Rome, abbreviated MEFR), Paris, Rome (1881–present).
- René Cagnat et alii, L'Année épigraphique (The Year in Epigraphy, abbreviated AE), Presses Universitaires de France (1888–present).
- George Davis Chase, "The Origin of Roman Praenomina", in Harvard Studies in Classical Philology, vol. VIII (1897).
- Paul von Rohden, Elimar Klebs, & Hermann Dessau, Prosopographia Imperii Romani (The Prosopography of the Roman Empire, abbreviated PIR), Berlin (1898).
- Fanou Papazoglou, Inscriptions de la Mésie Supérieure (Inscriptions of Moesia Superior, abbreviated IMS), Belgrade (1976–present).
- John C. Traupman, The New College Latin & English Dictionary, Bantam Books, New York (1995).
