= Milan Đokić =

Milan Đokić may refer to:

- Milan Đokić (politician)
- Milan Đokić (footballer)
