= Vasilj (Knjaževac) =

- Village
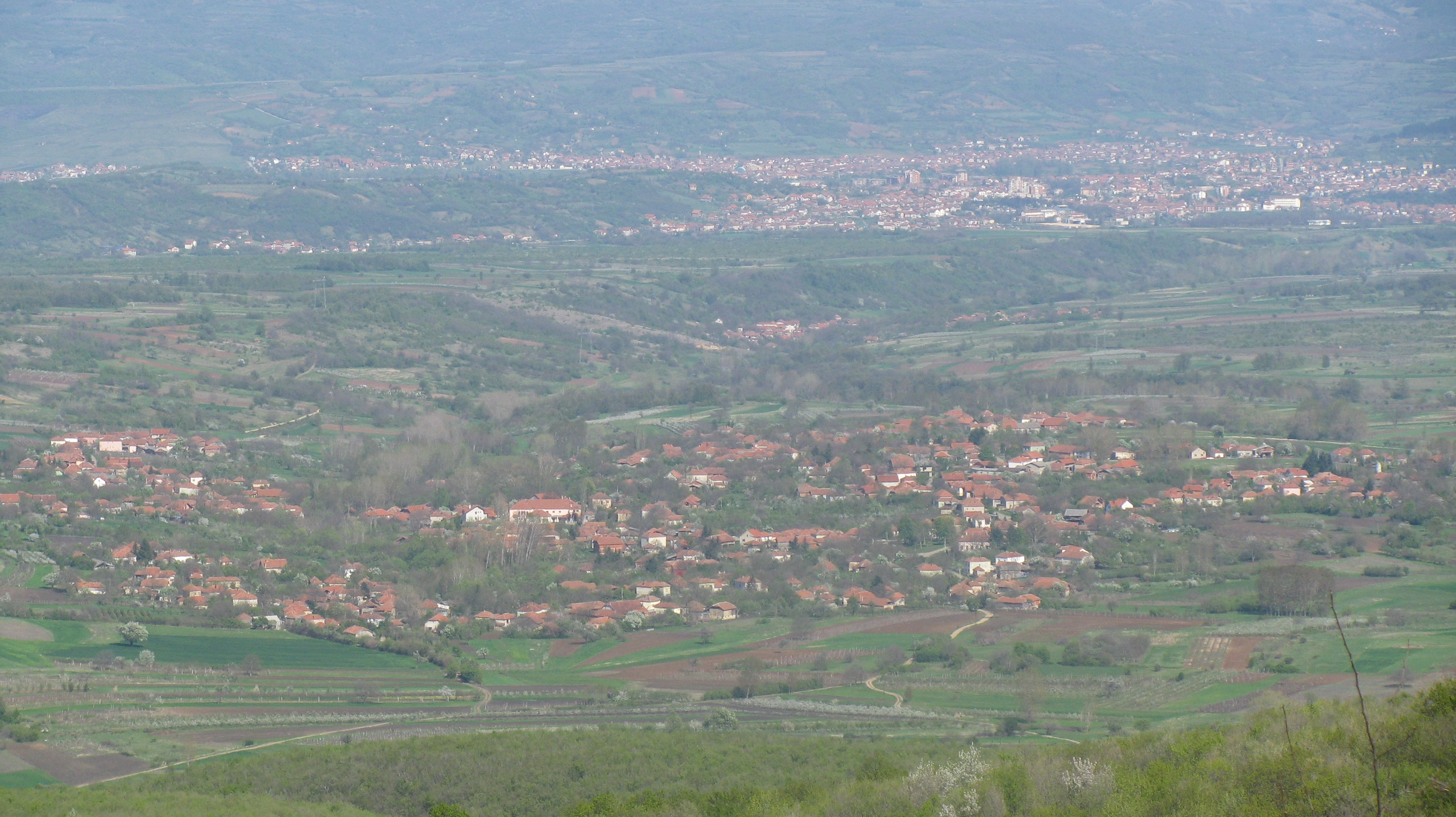

- Location within Serbia
- Coordinates: 43°34′10″N 22°09′25″E
- Country: Serbia
- District: Zaječar District
- Municipality: Knjaževac

Population (2011)
  - Total: 596
- Time zone: UTC+1 (CET)
  - Summer (DST): UTC+2 (CEST)
- Postal code: 19367

Vasilj is a village in the municipality of Knjaževac, Serbia. According to the 2011 census, the village has a population of 596 people.
