= Vasilj =

Vasilj may refer to:

- Vasilj (given name), a masculine given name
- Vasilj (surname), a surname
- Vasilj (Knjaževac), a village in the municipality of Knjaževac, Serbia
