= Ravna (Knjaževac) =

Ravna Reka
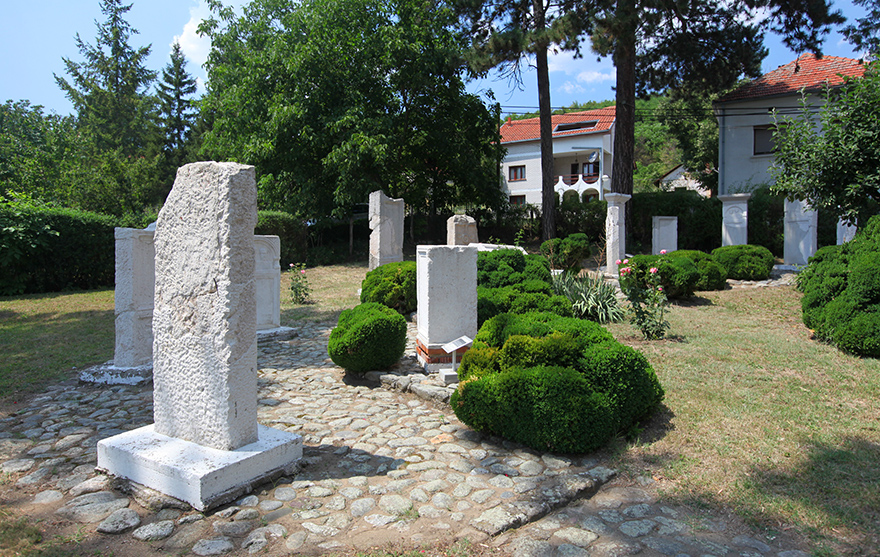
- Park in Ravna

- Location within Serbia
- Coordinates: 43°38′01″N 22°14′40″E
- Country: Serbia
- Time zone: UTC+1 (CET)
  - Summer (DST): UTC+2 (CEST)

Ravna Reka (Serbian: Равна Река) is a settlement and archaeological site near Knjaževac, Serbia. The population of the Ravna is 252, while the population of the settlement is 236 (2002 census). In ancient times it was known as Timacum Minus, while archaeological site nearby still hold that name. The Regional Museum in Knjaževac is in charge of preserving Timacum Minus.
