= Milan Đokić (politician) =

Serbian politician

Milan Đokić (Serbian Cyrillic: Милан Ђокић; born 1972) is a politician in Serbia. He has been the mayor of Knjaževac since 2012. Previously, he served in the National Assembly of Serbia from 2007 to 2010 as a member of G17 Plus. Đokić is now a member of the Serbian Progressive Party (Srpska napredna stranka, SNS).

== Private career ==
Đokić holds a bachelor's degree (1999) and a master's degree (2001) in physical culture from the University of Niš. He worked as a physical education teacher at the Knjaževac gymnasium from 1999 to 2001.

== Political career ==
Đokić served as deputy mayor of Knjaževac from 2001 to 2004 and was the town's municipal manager from 2004 to 2007.

He was included on the electoral list of G17 Plus for the 2007 Serbian parliamentary election and was selected for a mandate after the list won nineteen seats. (From 2000 to 2011, parliamentary mandates in Serbia were awarded at the discretion of successful parties or alliances, and it was common practice for mandates to be assigned to candidates out of numerical order. Đokić was given the forty-fourth position on the list, although this had no formal bearing on whether he received a mandate.) G17 Plus joined an unstable coalition government led by the Democratic Party (Demokratska stranka, DS) and the Democratic Party of Serbia (Demokratska stranka Srbije, DSS) after the election, and Đokić served as a government supporter.

The DS–DSS alliance broke down in early 2008, and a new election was held in May of that year. G17 Plus participated in this election as part of the Democratic Party's For a European Serbia alliance. Đokić was included on the list, receiving the fifty-fifth position, and was again selected for a mandate. After extended negotiations, the Democratic Party and its allies formed a new coalition government with the Socialist Party of Serbia and other parties, and Đokić again served as a supporter of the ministry. He resigned from the assembly on 23 March 2010, when he was appointed as a secretary of state in the ministry of national investment plan. He continued in this role after the ministry was merged into the ministry of economy and regional development in 2011, serving until a new government was formed in 2012.

Serbia's electoral system was reformed in 2011, such that parliamentary mandates were awarded in numerical order to candidates on successful lists. G17 Plus contested the 2012 Serbian parliamentary election as part of the United Regions of Serbia (Ujedinjeni regioni Srbije, URS) coalition; Đokić received the twenty-eighth position on its list and was not returned when the list won only sixteen mandates. G17 Plus subsequently merged into the URS, and Đokić received the tenth position on its list in the 2014 parliamentary election. The list did not cross the electoral threshold to win representation in the assembly, and the party subsequently dissolved.

=== Mayor of Knjaževac ===
Đokić led the URS to victory in Knjaževac in the 2012 local elections and was subsequently chosen as mayor by the municipal assembly. He formed his own municipal party called "Knjaz" after the demise of the URS; this party won fewer seats than the Serbian Progressive Party in the 2016 local elections, but Đokić continued as mayor after forming a new coalition with the Progressives and the United Peasant Party. Knjaz collectively joined the Progressive Party in June 2016, and Đokić became the leader of the Progressive Party's local committee in Knjaževac in December 2017.
