= Timacum Minus =

Coordinates: 43°38′30.1″N 22°16′1.09″E

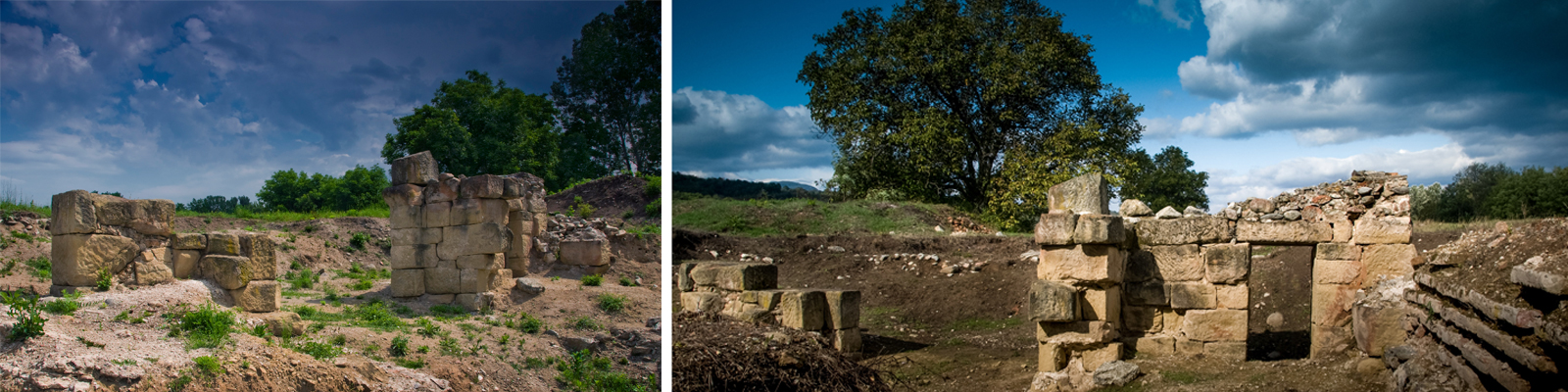
Remains of walls

Timacum Minus (Latin: Timacum Minus, also known as Serbian: Ravna, Kuline, or Gradište) is archeological site located in Ravna Reka, Serbia. Site was declared Monument of Culture of Great Importance in 1979, and it is protected by Republic of Serbia. Timacum Minus is the oldest military fort in the Timok Valley, eastern Serbia.

== Geography ==
Timacum Minus and its counterpart Timacum Maius (near Svrljig) are located in the Timok river valley. The area is surrounded by a hilly landscape with many mountain ranges which traverse the region. The location of Timacum Minus was on the Roman route Lissus-Naissus-Ratiaria. Trade routes from the Balkans coalesced in the Naissus region. Timacum Minus is located 60 km northeast of Naissus.

== History ==
Timacum Minus was a strategic location for the Romans Empire. The region of Naissus was the center of the trade network from the north-south and west-east axis in the Balkans. In the areas near Naissus extensive mining activity was promoted by the Roman administration which necessitated the establishment of permanents forts, road networks and administrative facilities. Legio V Macedonica and IV Scythica, followed by a small auxiliary force from cohors I Thracum Syriaca. The road network began to develop and other military camps were built in this early period: Timacum Mais (Niševac), Timacum Minus (Ravna) and Combustica (Kladorub). During the reign of Marcus Aurelius, cohors I Thracum Syriaca was replaced with the newly founded cohors II Aurelia Dardanorum, formed by the local population of the province of Moesia Superior. In this period, latrones Dardaniae (Dardanian brigants) were active in the area of Timacum Minus. The deployment of c. II Aurelia Dardanorum marks the building of the first permanent military base in Timacum Minus, around which the urban settlement developed. Permanent military deployment coincided with mining development and large-scale road construction.

The archeological site is located SE from a small village of Ravna, north from Knjaževac, near White Timok River. Fortress and nearby village was dated in 1st century AD, and last up until Justinian's restoration of the empire in 6th century. Only few kilometers away from the fortress, on the slope of the Slog hill, two Roman necropolis were found, with numerous findings and burial gifts (jewelry, ceramic and glass vessels, money, etc.). Archeological findings from this site are mostly presented in the County Museum of Knjaževac and as well in the archeo-ethno park on site, where lapidarium is formed.

== Gallery ==
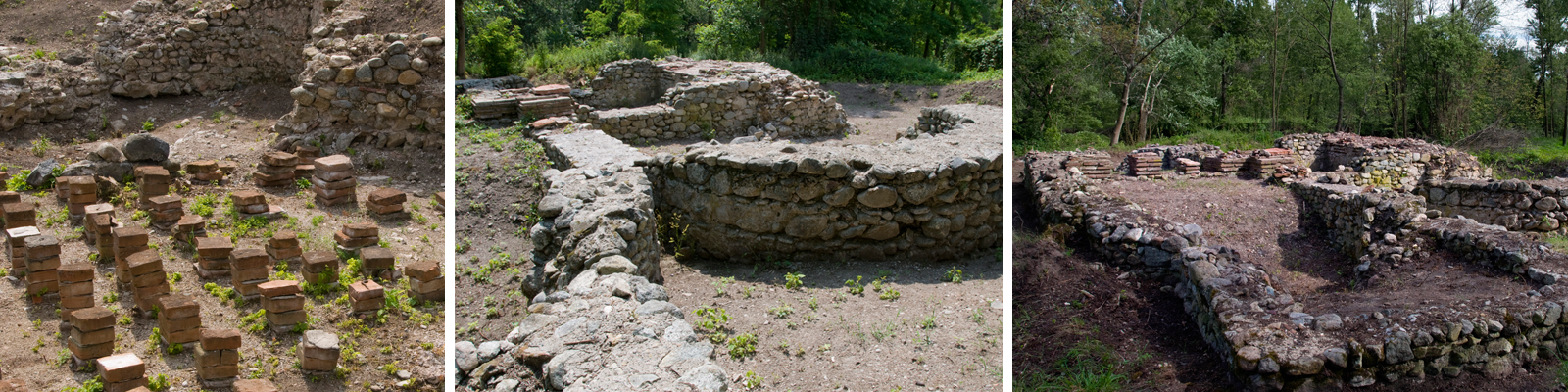
Ruins at the archaeological site

== See also ==
- Monuments of Culture of Great Importance
- Tourism in Serbia

== Sources ==
- Diers, Lina (2018). "Timacum Minus in Moesia Superior—Centrality and Urbanism at a Roman Mining Settlement". Land. 7 (4): 126. doi:10.3390/land7040126.
- Mócsy, Andras (2014) [1974]. Pannonia and Upper Moesia (Routledge Revivals): A History of the Middle Danube Provinces of the Roman Empire. Routledge. ISBN 978-1317754251.
