= Zaječar District =

Administrative district of Serbia

Zaječar District Зајечарски округ
- Administrative district of Serbia
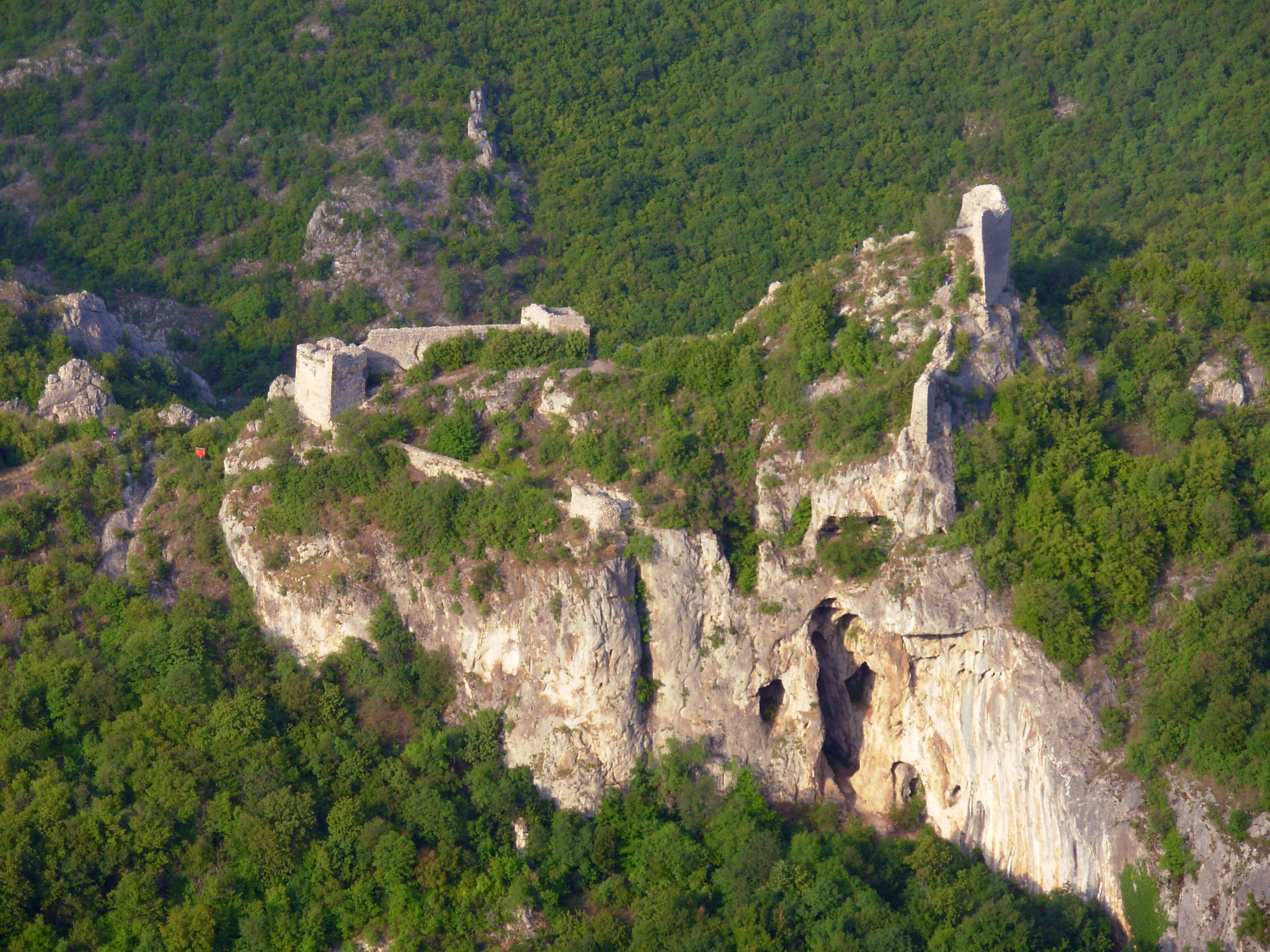
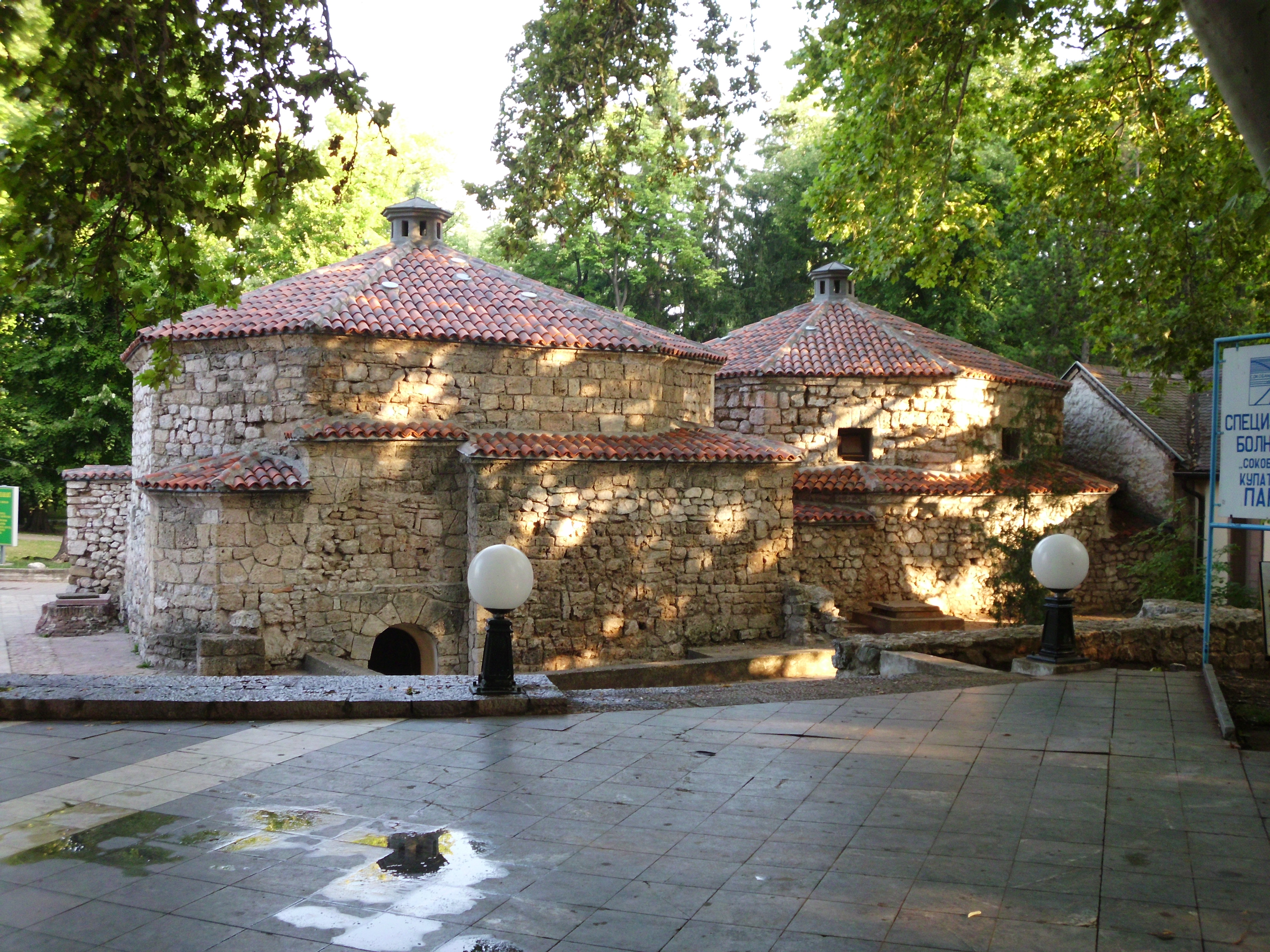
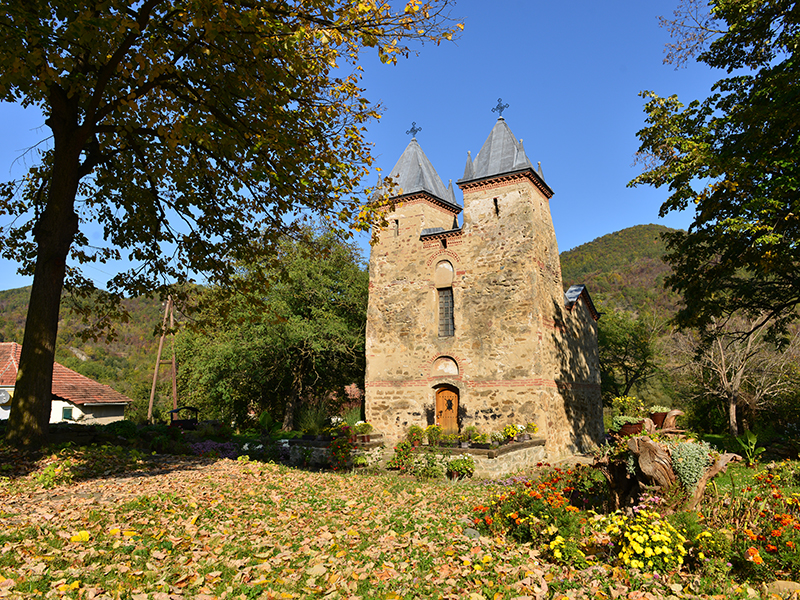
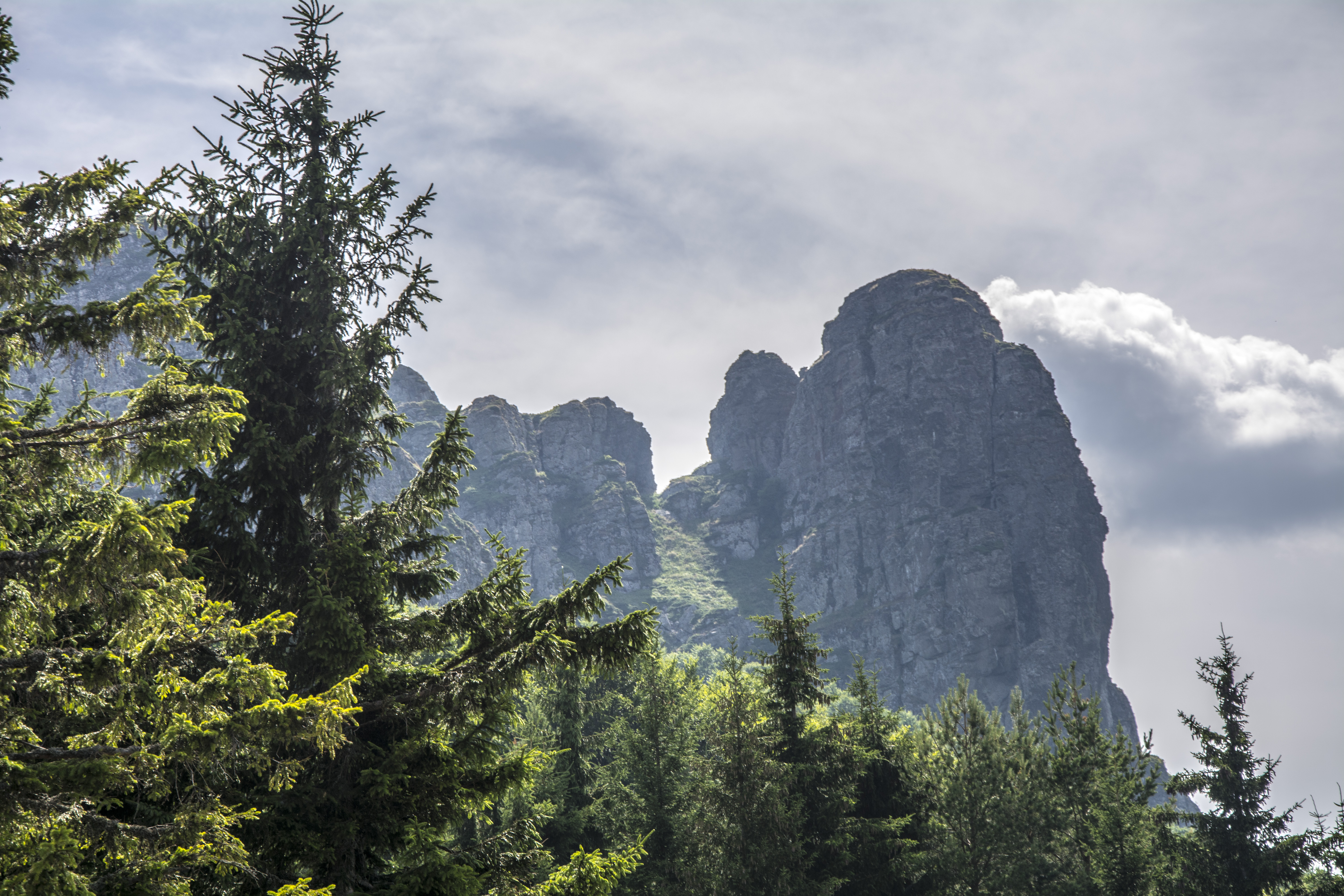
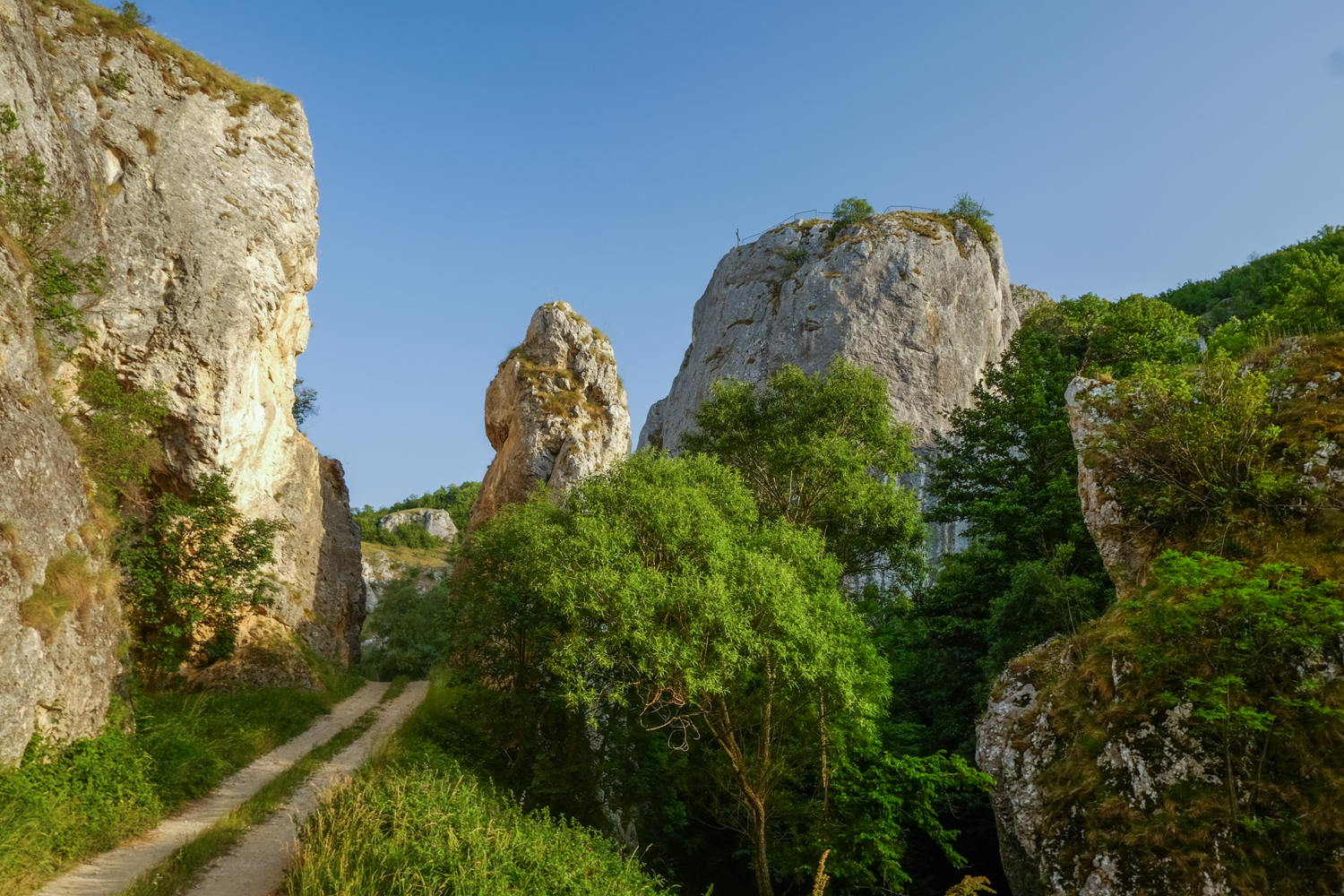
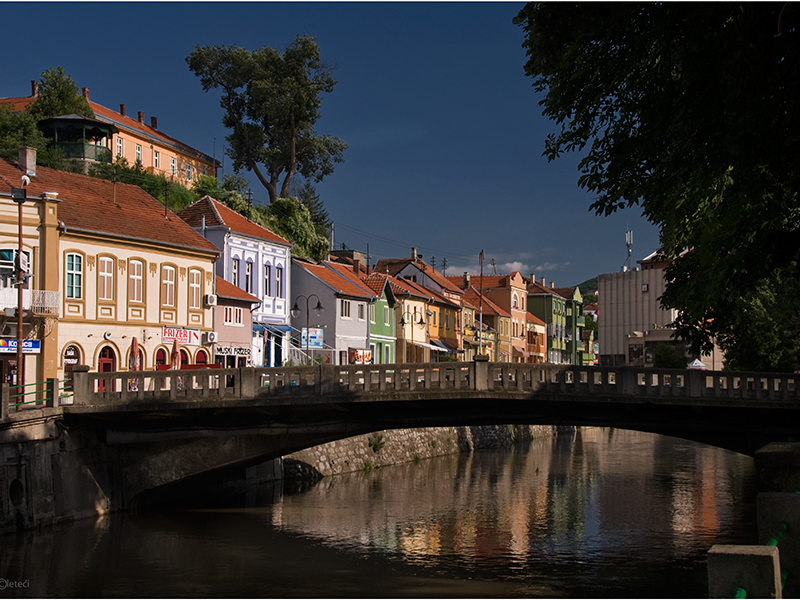
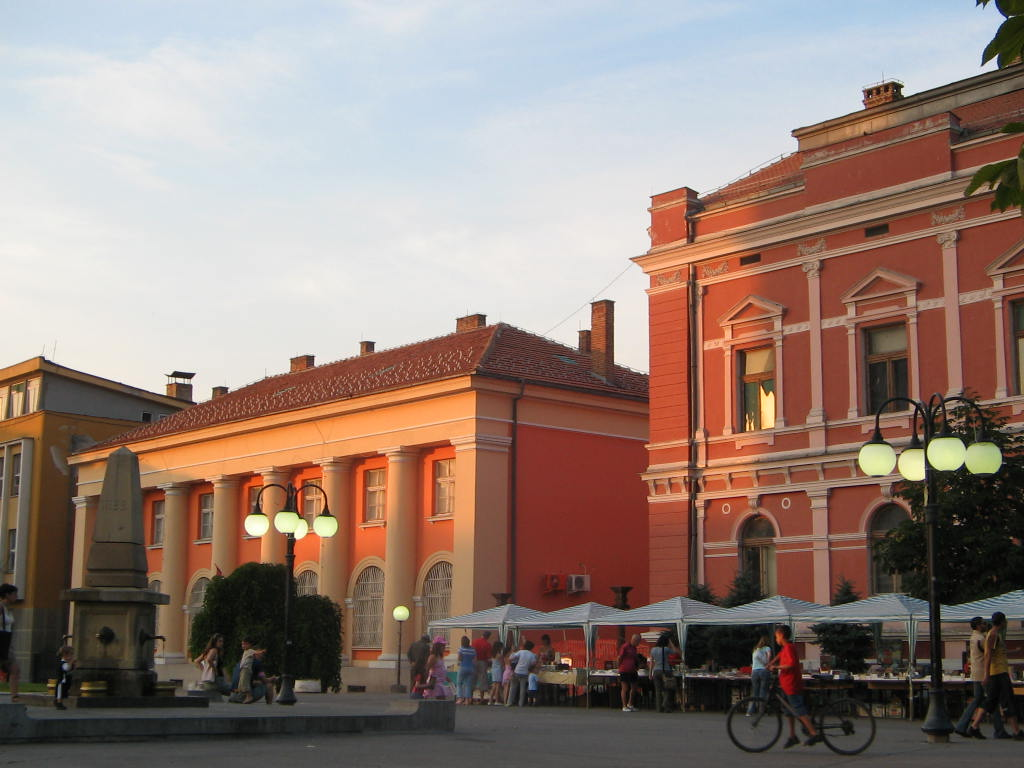
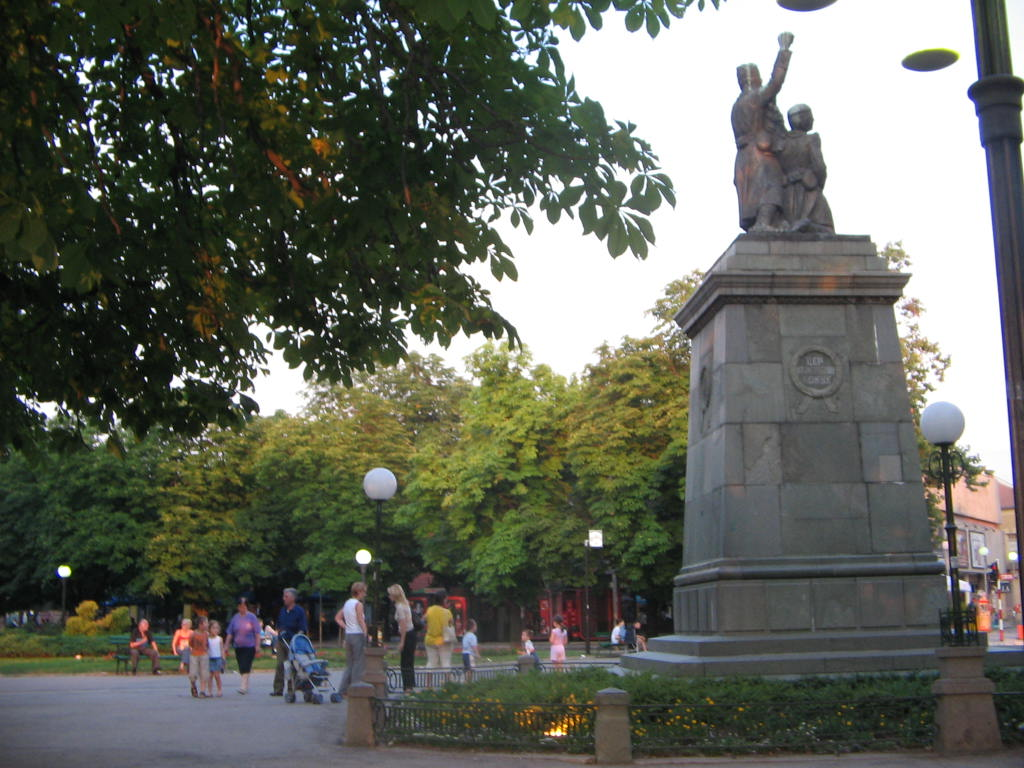
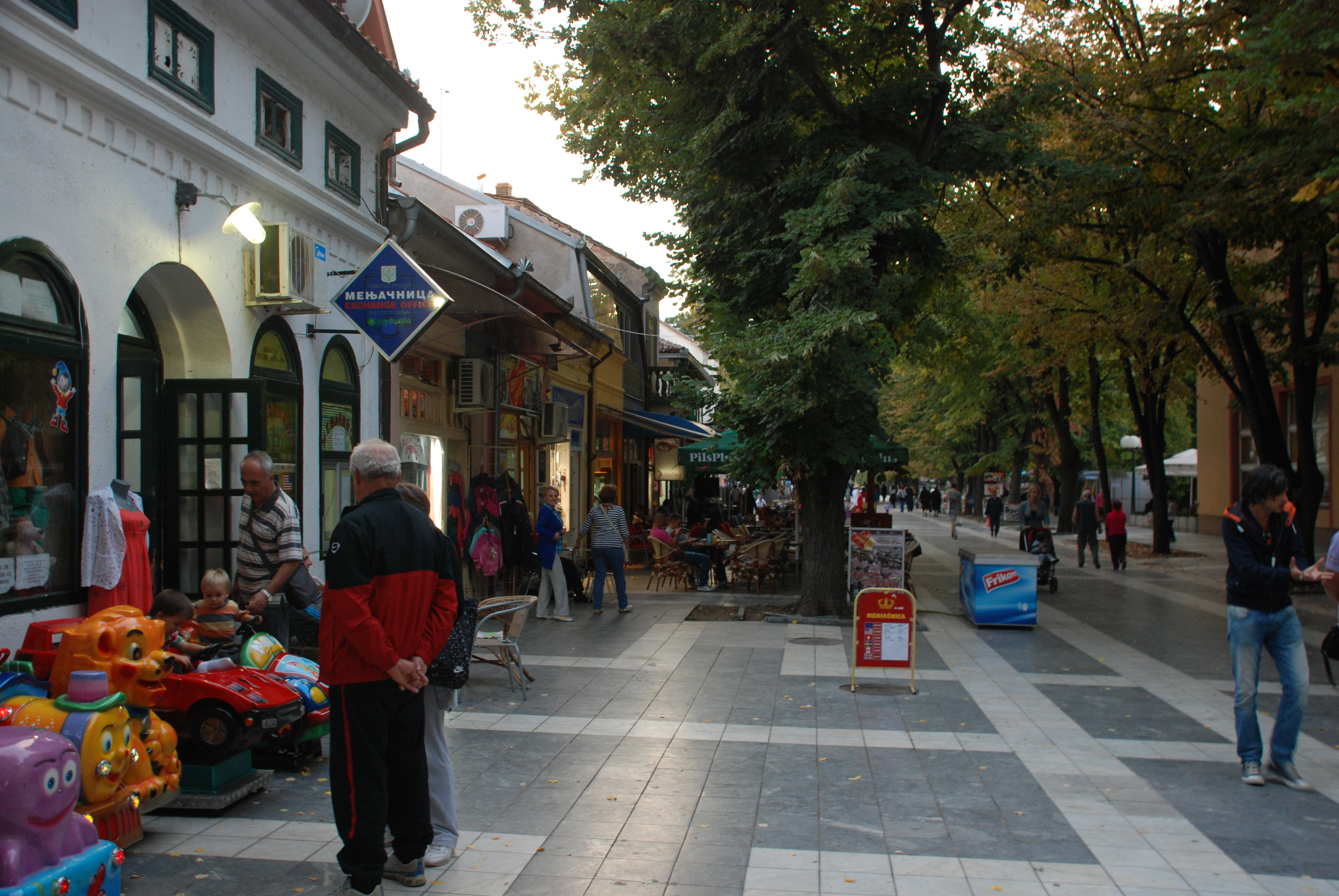
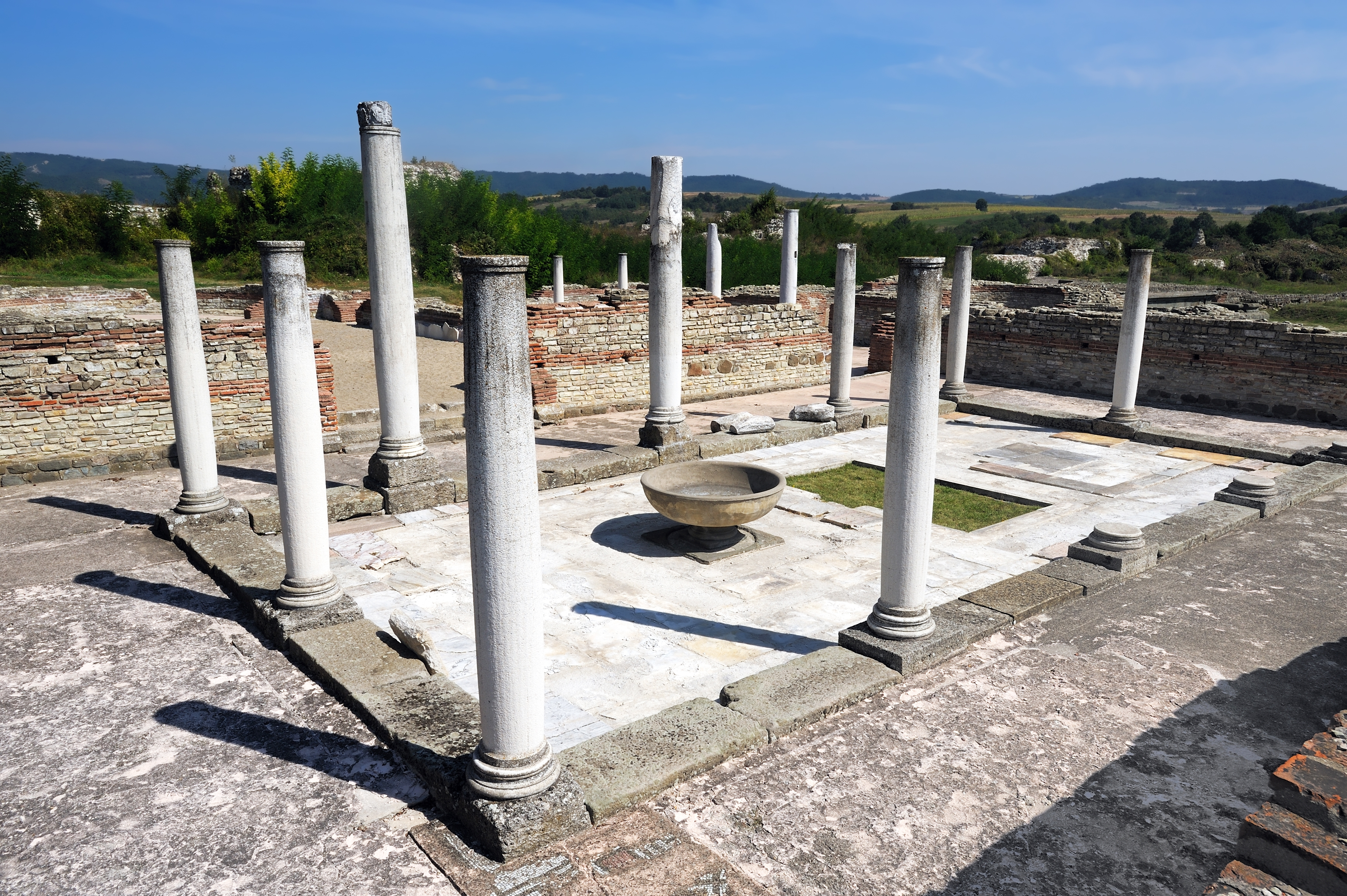
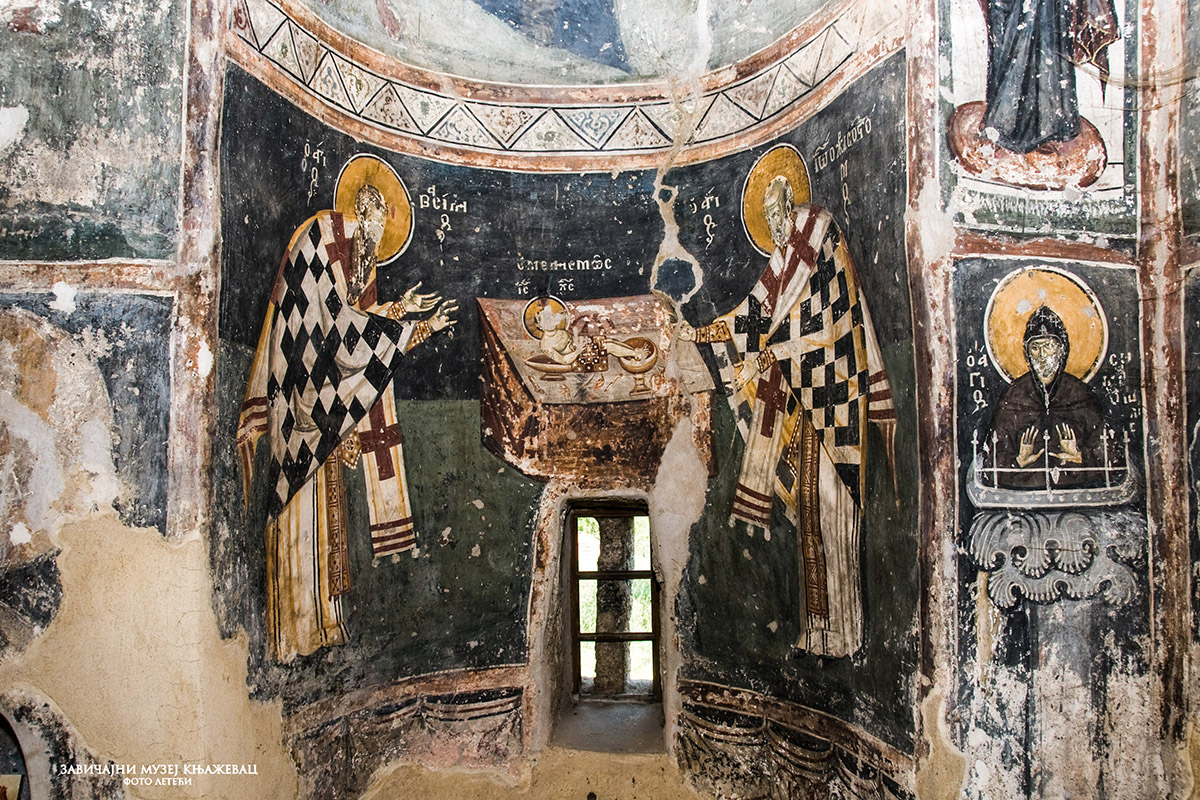
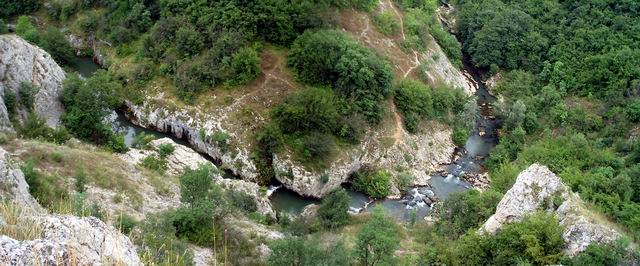
- Images from the Zaječar District

- Location of district in Serbia
- Coordinates: 43°55′N 22°18′E
- Country: Serbia
- Administrative center: Zaječar

Government
  - Commissioner: Vladan Paunović

Area
  - Total: 3,623 km^{2} (1,399 sq mi)

Population (2022)
  - Total: 96,715
  - Density: 26.69/km^{2} (69.14/sq mi)
- ISO 3166 code: RS-15
- Municipalities: 3 and 1 city
- Settlements: 173
- Cities and towns: 5
- Villages: 168
- Website: zajecarski.okrug.gov.rs

The Zaječar District (Serbian: Зајечарски округ, romanized: Zaječarski okrug, pronounced [zâjɛtʃarskiː ôkruːɡ]) is one of administrative districts of Serbia. It lies in the eastern part of the country. According to the 2022 census, it has a population of 96,715 inhabitants. The administrative center of the Zaječar District is the city of Zaječar.

== History ==
The present-day administrative districts (including Zaječar District) were established in 1992 by the decree of the Government of Serbia.

== Cities and municipalities ==
Zaječar District encompasses the territories of one city and three municipalities:

- Zaječar (city)
- Boljevac (municipality)
- Knjaževac (municipality)
- Sokobanja (municipality)

== Demographics ==
Historical population
Year	Pop.	±%
1948	173,603	—
1953	177,332	+2.1%
1961	178,623	+0.7%
1971	172,424	−3.5%
1981	170,682	−1.0%
1991	158,131	−7.4%
2002	137,561	−13.0%
2011	119,967	−12.8%
2022	96,715	−19.4%

=== Towns ===
There is just one town with over 10,000 inhabitants: Zaječar, with 32,448 inhabitants.

=== Ethnic structure ===
Ethnicity	Population	Share
Serbs	84,458	87.4%
Vlachs	3,146	3.2%
Roma	1,716	1.7%
Others	1,544	1.6%
Undeclared/Unknown	5,851	6%

== See also ==
- Administrative districts of Serbia
- Administrative divisions of Serbia
