= Knjaževac =

Knjaževac Књажевац (Serbian)
- Town and municipality
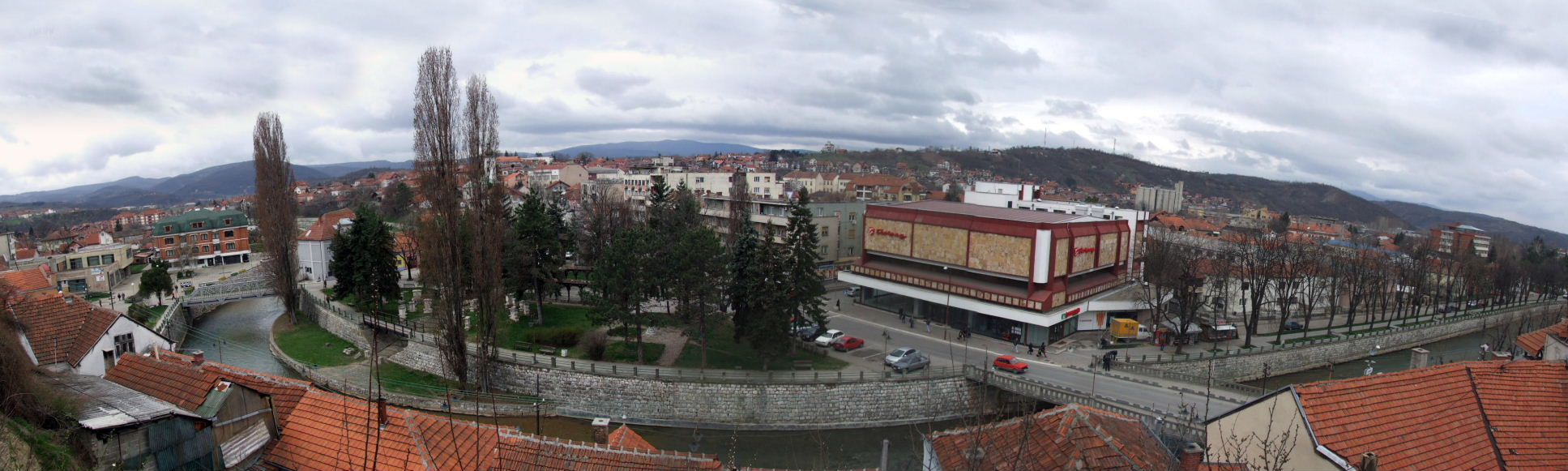
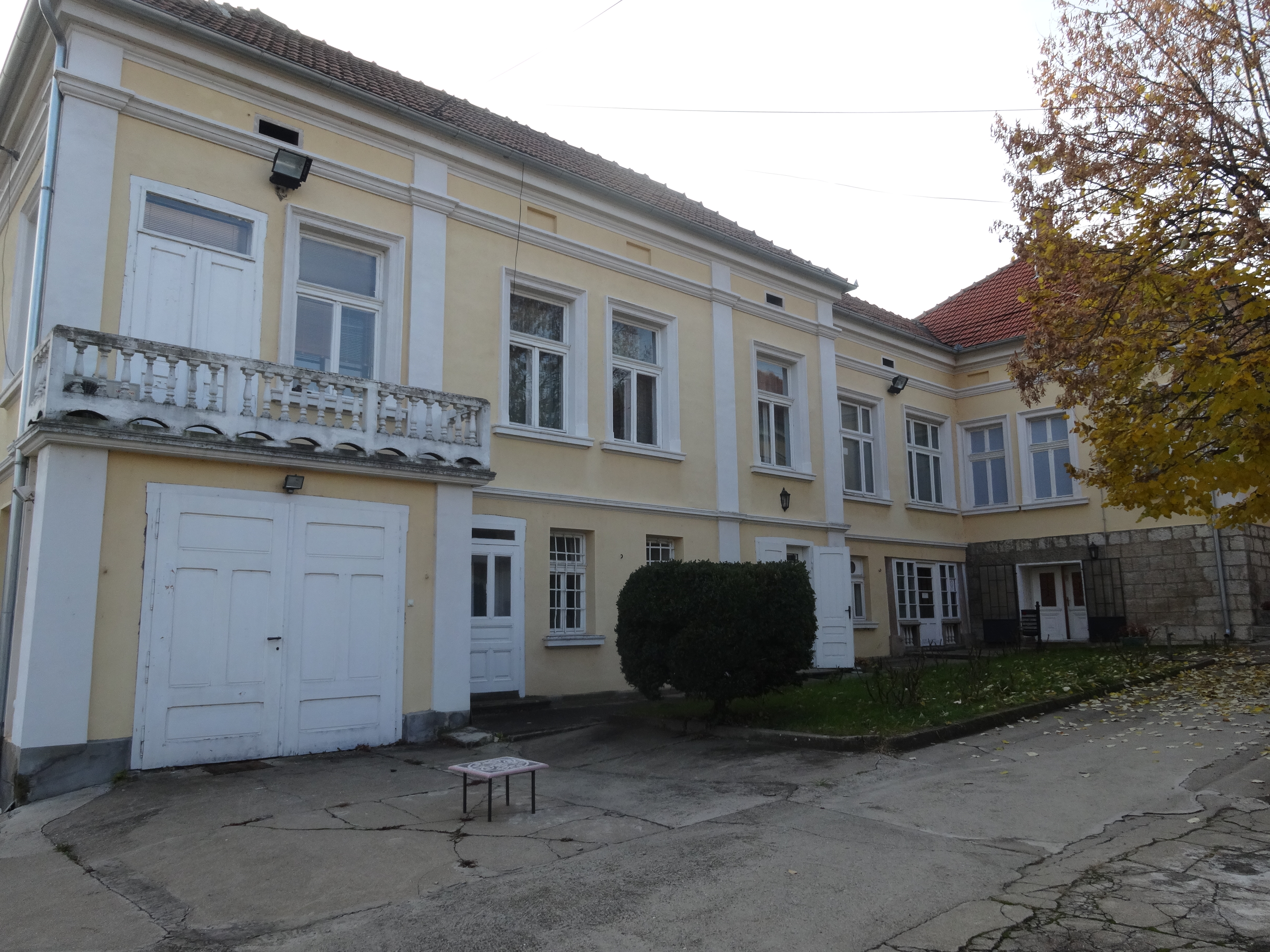
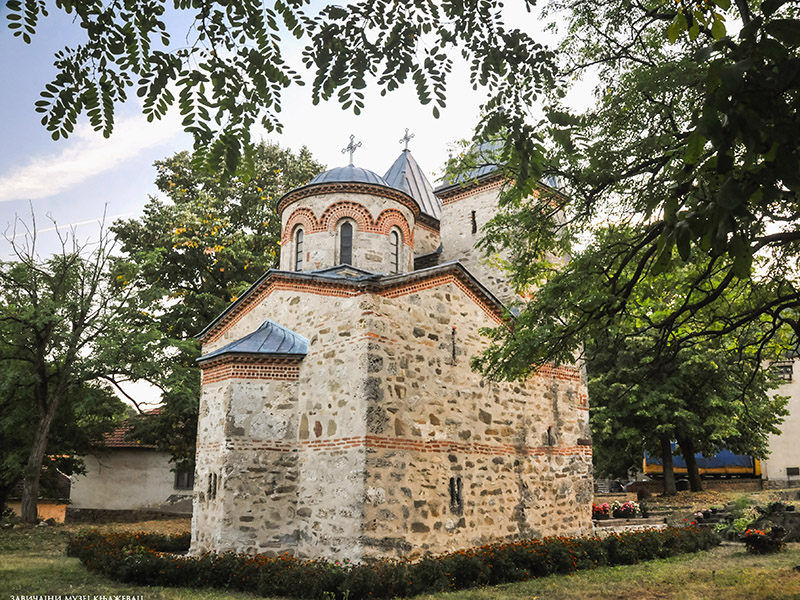
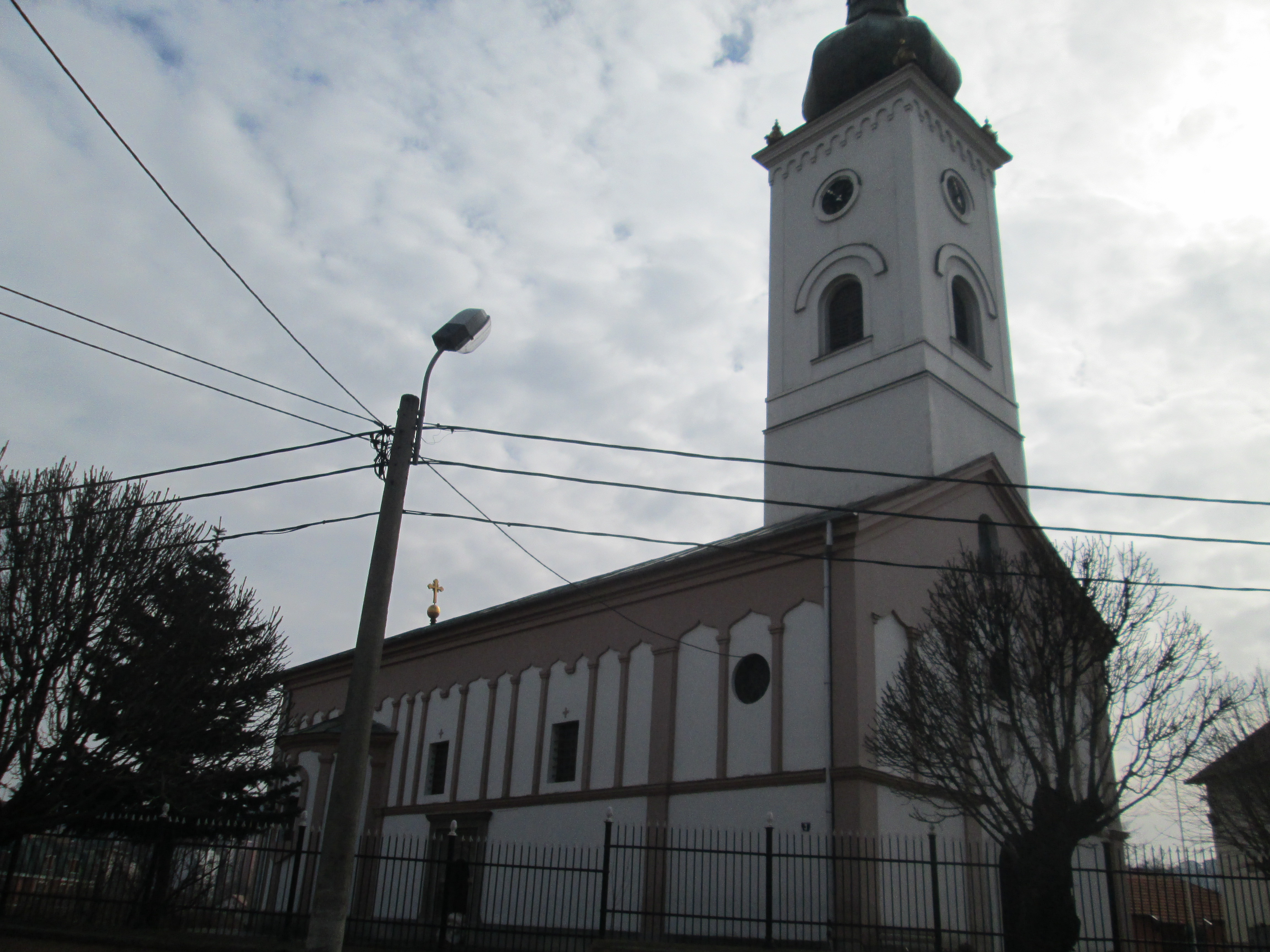
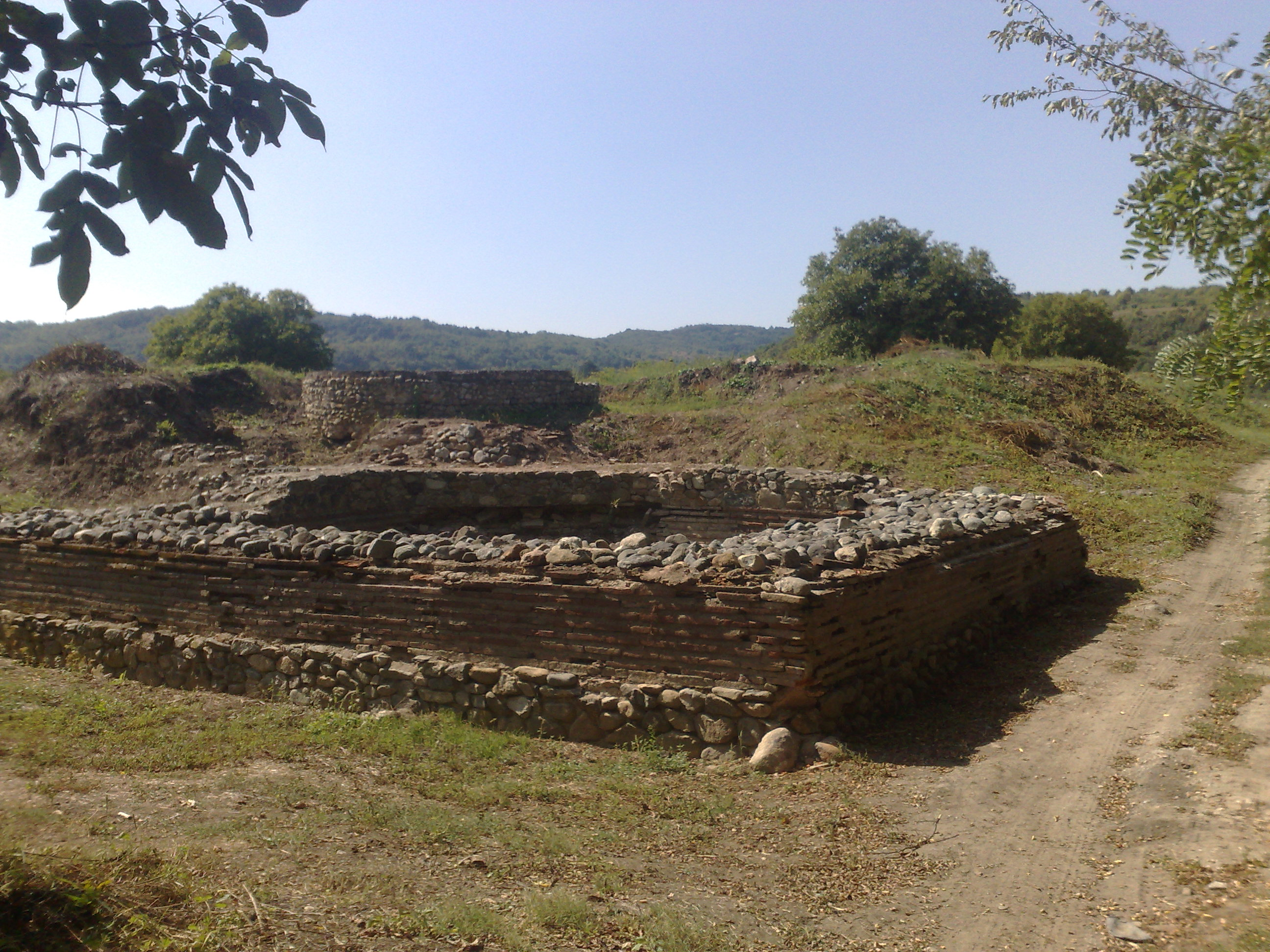
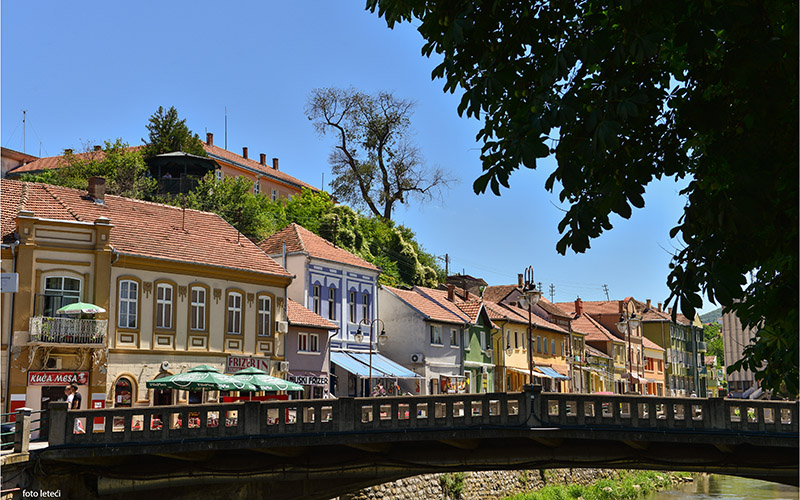
- From top: Panorama of the town, National museom of Knjaževac, Church of the Holy Mother of God, Church of St. George, Archaeological site "Timacum Minus", Old city

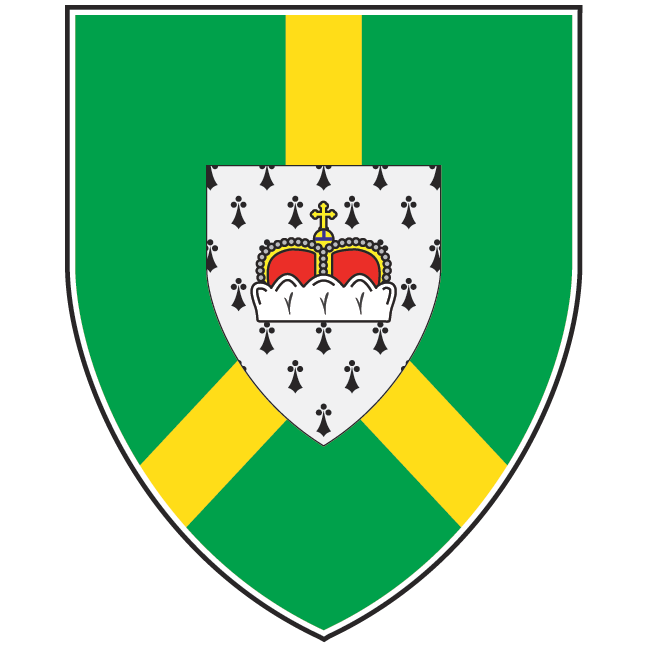
- Coat of arms

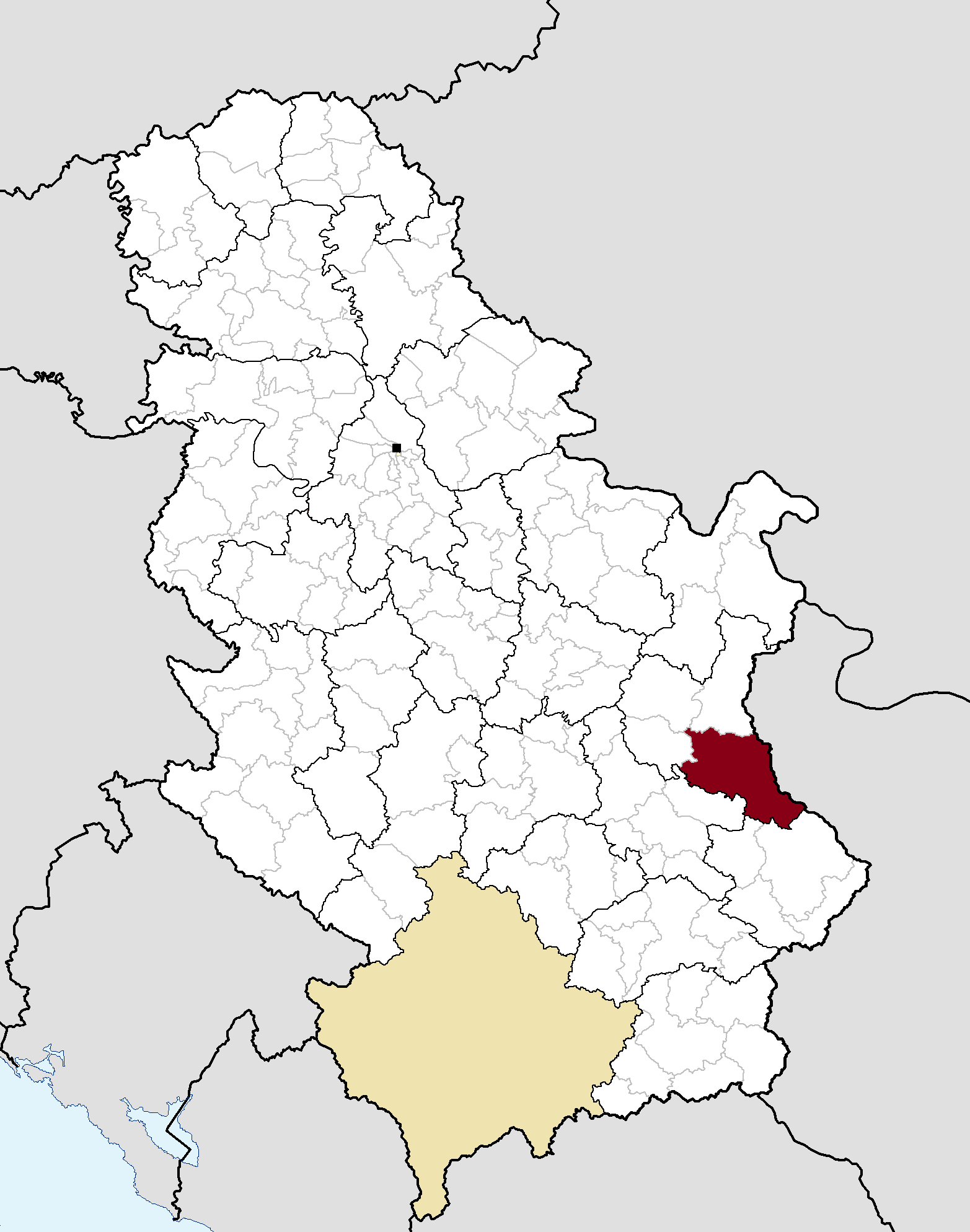
- Location of the municipality of Knjaževac within Serbia
- Coordinates: 43°34′03″N 22°15′27″E
- Country: Serbia
- Region: Southern and Eastern Serbia
- District: Zaječar
- Settlements: 86

Government
  - Mayor: Milan Đokić (SNS)

Area
  - Rank: 6th
  - Town: 22.68 km^{2} (8.76 sq mi)
  - Municipality: 1,202 km^{2} (464 sq mi)
- Elevation: 221 m (725 ft)

Population (2022 census)
  - Town: 16,350
  - Town density: 720.9/km^{2} (1,867/sq mi)
  - Municipality: 25,341
  - Municipality density: 21.08/km^{2} (54.60/sq mi)
- Time zone: UTC+1 (CET)
  - Summer (DST): UTC+2 (CEST)
- Postal code: 19350
- Area code: +381(0)19
- Car plates: KŽ
- Website: www.knjazevac.rs

Knjaževac (Serbian Cyrillic: Књажевац, pronounced [kɲǎːʒɛʋat͡s]) is a town and municipality located in the Zaječar District of the eastern Serbia. As of 2022, the municipality has a population of 25,341 inhabitants, while the town has 16,350 inhabitants.

The town is situated between three mountains, in the geographical region of the Timok Valley bordering Bulgaria.

== History ==
Near Knjaževac, in the village of Gabrovnica, there is a cave whose walls hide the only preserved prehistoric cave drawing in Serbia. The drawing is related to the end of the Bronze Age and the beginning of the Iron Age. Its age is between 3000 and 4000 years. Based on the type of dagger that is represented above the horse's neck, it is concluded that the drawing is from the Bronze Age period.

In the Roman period, Timacum Minus fort existed near the village of Ravna, within the present municipality. It was built in the 1st century near the Roman road Naissus–Ratiaria and used for hundreds of years, with the last restoration during the Justinian era.

Medieval monuments in the area include the 14th century Church of the Holy Mother of God in Donja Kamenica, notable for its unusual architectural style and fresco paintings. Holy Trinity Monastery is located in the village of Gornja Kamenica and dates back from the 15th century. Both sites are protected as cultural monuments of great importance.

The area was occupied by the Ottomans in 1396 and became a part of Sanjak of Vidin. According to the records from the XVII century, the town consisted of 46 Turkish and 120 Christian households.

In 1833, the town, formerly known as Gurgusovac, was liberated from the Ottoman Empire and was administrated into the Krajina nahija of the Principality of Serbia in 1834. In 1859 the official name was changed to Knjaževac. From 1929 to 1944, Knjaževac was part of the Morava Banovina of the Kingdom of Yugoslavia. In 1944, a train tunnel was built in the town, which is depicted in the town's coat of arms.

=== Gurgusovac Tower ===
During the Ottoman period, the fortress, known as the Gurgusovac Tower, after the then name of the town, was built with a purpose to control the Niš-Vidin road. Strategically located, encompassed by the rampart and a deep trench, the fort hosted the company of 100 soldiers. The tower with two floors and a basement was square shaped and the rampart surrounding it was 13 m (43 ft) long, 10 m (33 ft) wide and 2.5 m (8 ft 2 in) tall.

After the liberation from the Ottomans, the fort lost its strategic importance and was turned into a dungeon-type prison. Numerous adversaries of Prince Alexander Karađorđević and the Defenders of the Constitution regime were jailed in the tower. Due to its notoriety because of the torture and abuse, it became a symbol of suffering and was nicknamed the "Serbian Bastille". After Prince Miloš Obrenović returned to Serbia in 1858 and replaced Alexander Karađorđević, he visited Gurgusovac and ordered for the tower to be burned to the ground. The tower was razed, with only one wall and an entry gate remaining, while in order to commemorate the prince's decision, the name of the town of Gurgusovac was changed to Knјаževac ("Prince's town") on 17 January 1859.

In the 2010s, the area of the former tower was adapted into the open-air cultural venue, including the summer stage. The wall and the gate were kept while the additional walls were rebuilt on the remaining foundations.

== Geography ==
The municipality extends over an area of 1202km^{2} and is the sixth largest in the Republic of Serbia. Its countryside is mostly hilly and mountainous.

The highest point in the territory of the municipality is Midžor on Stara Planina (2169 m), which is also the second highest peak in the Republic of Serbia. The lowest point is 176 metres high and is situated in the Knjaževac valley. There are 86 inhabited places in the municipality of which 85 are villages. The town itself is situated at the confluence of the Trgoviški Timok and the Svrljiški Timok which become the Beli Timok. It flows on towards Zaječar, merges with the Crni Timok and becomes simply, Timok. It is this river that gives name to the Timok Valley region.

Knjaževac is connected with other towns by road and railroad traffic. It is located between the latitudes of 43°20' and 43°45' north and between the longitudes 22°11' and 22°41' east.

=== Climate ===
Knjaževac has a humid subtropical climate (Köppen climate classification: Cfa) bordering on a hot-summer mediterranean climate (Köppen climate classification: Csa). The warmest month is July with an average temperature of 23 °C (73 °F), whereas the coldest month is January with average temperature of 0.7 °C (33 °F). Average annual rainfall is 606.7 mm/m^{2}. There are 306 sunny days and 21 days with snow in a year.

Climate data for Knjaževac
Month	Jan	Feb	Mar	Apr	May	Jun	Jul	Aug	Sep	Oct	Nov	Dec	Year
Record high °C (°F)	21.4 (70.5)	26.6 (79.9)	29.4 (84.9)	33.2 (91.8)	35.5 (95.9)	40.4 (104.7)	44.1 (111.4)	40.9 (105.6)	37.8 (100.0)	31.9 (89.4)	27.7 (81.9)	22.1 (71.8)	44.1 (111.4)
Mean daily maximum °C (°F)	5.3 (41.5)	8.6 (47.5)	13.8 (56.8)	19.6 (67.3)	23.8 (74.8)	28.6 (83.5)	31.7 (89.1)	32.0 (89.6)	26.0 (78.8)	19.0 (66.2)	12.2 (54.0)	6.7 (44.1)	18.9 (66.1)
Daily mean °C (°F)	0.8 (33.4)	3.1 (37.6)	7.3 (45.1)	12.3 (54.1)	16.6 (61.9)	21.1 (70.0)	23.3 (73.9)	22.9 (73.2)	17.8 (64.0)	11.8 (53.2)	6.9 (44.4)	2.6 (36.7)	12.2 (54.0)
Mean daily minimum °C (°F)	−3.0 (26.6)	−1.5 (29.3)	1.5 (34.7)	5.6 (42.1)	10.0 (50.0)	14.1 (57.4)	15.5 (59.9)	14.9 (58.8)	11.1 (52.0)	6.1 (43.0)	2.8 (37.0)	−0.9 (30.4)	6.3 (43.4)
Record low °C (°F)	−20.8 (−5.4)	−21.8 (−7.2)	−12.8 (9.0)	−6.2 (20.8)	−0.7 (30.7)	5.8 (42.4)	8.1 (46.6)	5.2 (41.4)	−0.4 (31.3)	−4.2 (24.4)	−10.1 (13.8)	−16.6 (2.1)	−21.8 (−7.2)
Average precipitation mm (inches)	53.2 (2.09)	39.9 (1.57)	47.6 (1.87)	40.5 (1.59)	62.0 (2.44)	67.3 (2.65)	69.9 (2.75)	33.5 (1.32)	32.9 (1.30)	53.0 (2.09)	53.3 (2.10)	53.7 (2.11)	606.8 (23.88)
Average ultraviolet index	1.2	2.0	3.3	5.1	7.4	8.8	9.6	8.5	7.1	3.9	2.0	0.8	5.0
Source: vreme.in.rs

== Demographics ==
Historical population
Year	Pop.	±% p.a.
1948	61,560	—
1953	61,973	+0.13%
1961	59,445	−0.52%
1971	52,010	−1.33%
1981	48,789	−0.64%
1991	44,036	−1.02%
2002	37,172	−1.53%
2011	31,491	−1.83%
2022	25,341	−1.96%

According to the 2011 census results, the municipality of Knjaževac has 31,491 inhabitants, of which 18,404 inhabitants live in urban area. The average population density is 26.2 inhabitants per square kilometer making it a sparsely populated municipality.

=== Ethnic groups ===
The ethnic composition of the municipality:

Ethnic group	Population	%
Serbs	29,631	94.08%
Romani	789	2.51%
Macedonians	42	0.13%
Bulgarians	33	0.10%
Croats	23	0.07%
Albanians	22	0.07%
Montenegrins	20	0.06%
Vlachs	20	0.06%
Yugoslavs	15	0.05%
Hungarians	15	0.05%
Others	884	2.81%
Total	31,494	

== Economy ==
The following table gives a preview of total number of registered people employed in legal entities per their core activity (as of 2018):

Activity	Total
Agriculture, forestry and fishing	180
Mining and quarrying	-
Manufacturing	2,495
Electricity, gas, steam and air conditioning supply	64
Water supply; sewerage, waste management and remediation activities	135
Construction	110
Wholesale and retail trade, repair of motor vehicles and motorcycles	772
Transportation and storage	188
Accommodation and food services	307
Information and communication	61
Financial and insurance activities	45
Real estate activities	7
Professional, scientific and technical activities	220
Administrative and support service activities	126
Public administration and defense; compulsory social security	338
Education	465
Human health and social work activities	578
Arts, entertainment and recreation	86
Other service activities	112
Individual agricultural workers	133
Total	6,442

== Tourism ==
Knjaževac, with its Babin Zub ski center at an elevation of 1,758m offers opportunities for tourism and sports events. Its picnic areas are set in areas of natural beauty (like Banjica, Baranica and other), places for rest and recreation. The 14th-century Church of the Holy Mother of God lies in the nearby village of Donja Kamenica. In 2014, Knjaževac was chosen as the outstanding destination in Europe. (Project EDEN Network)

Among Serbs Knjaževac is known as Srpska Venecija (Serbian Venice)

== Sports ==
Local football club Timočanin has played in Serbia's third tier.

== Notable people ==
- Nenad Marinković, footballer
- Milos Milos, actor and bodyguard of Alain Delon
- Tihomir Đorđević, ethnologist, folklorist, cultural historian and professor at the University of Belgrade.
- Miloš Milojević, Football coach.
- Jovica Milijić, Malta futsal player.

== International relations ==
=== Twin towns — Sister cities ===
Knjaževac is twinned with:

- Belogradchik, Bulgaria, since 2011.
- Novi Bečej, Serbia

== Gallery ==
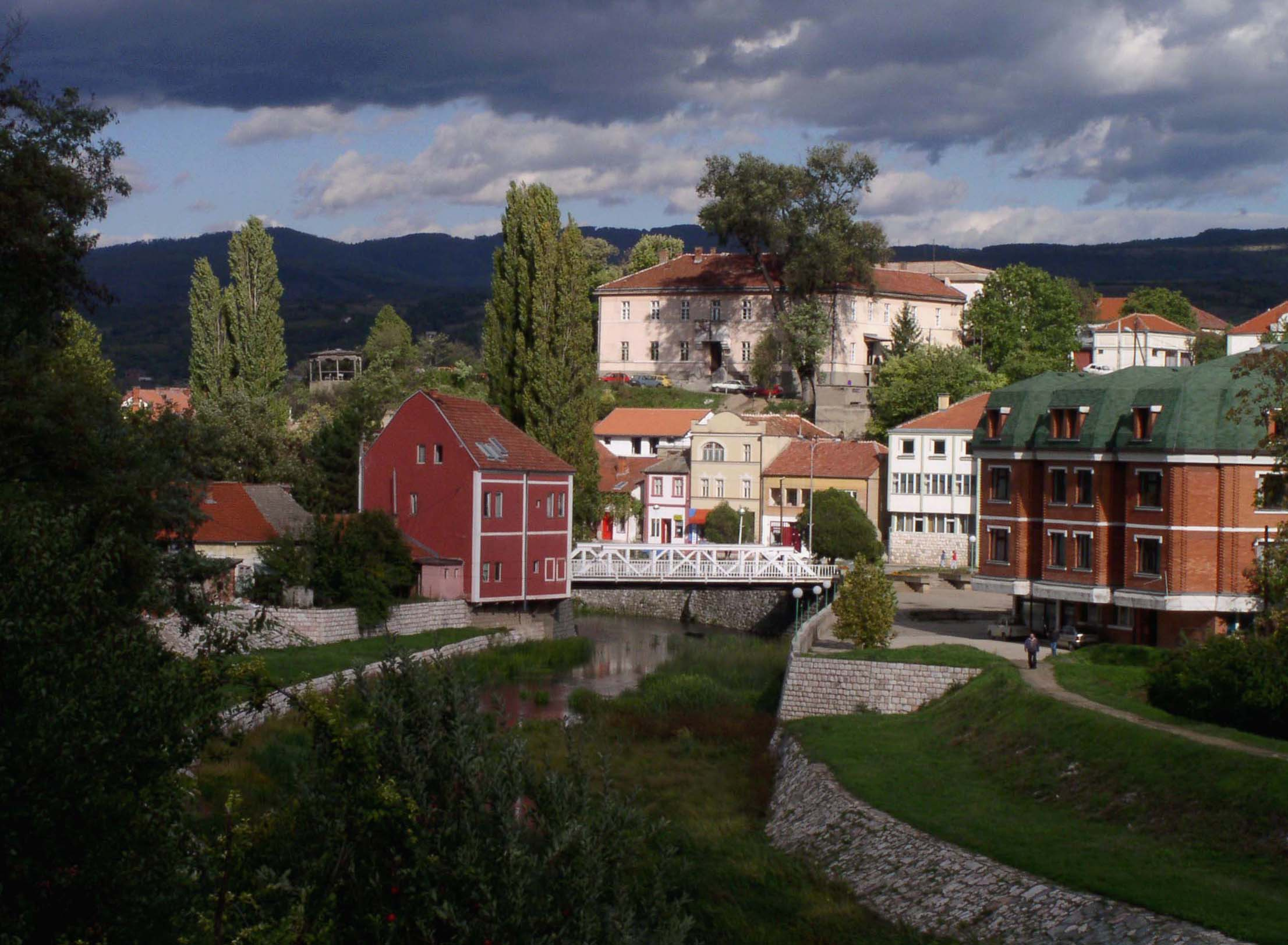
Knjaževac

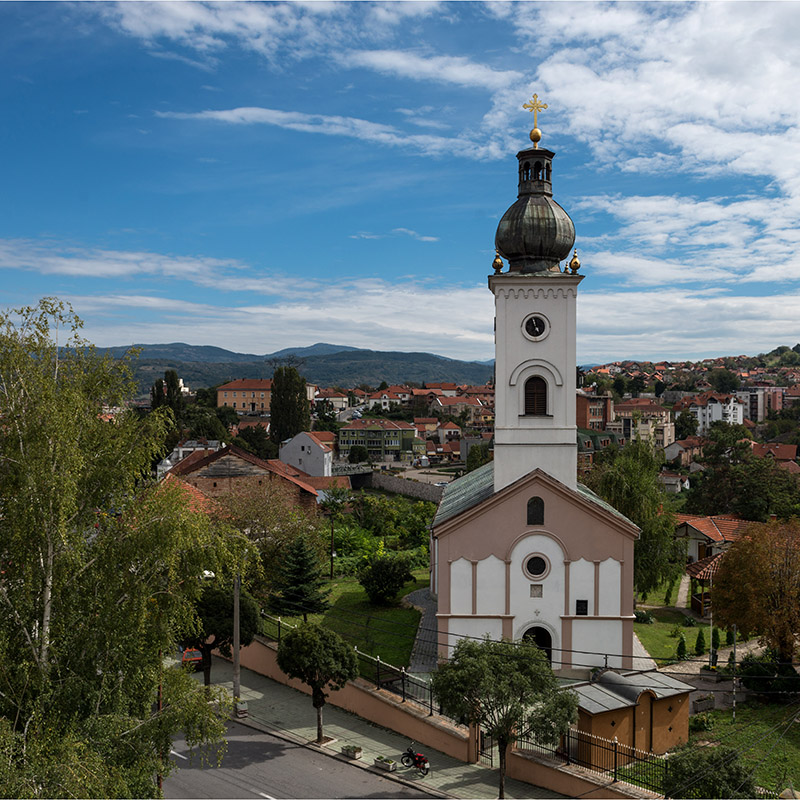
Church in Knjaževac

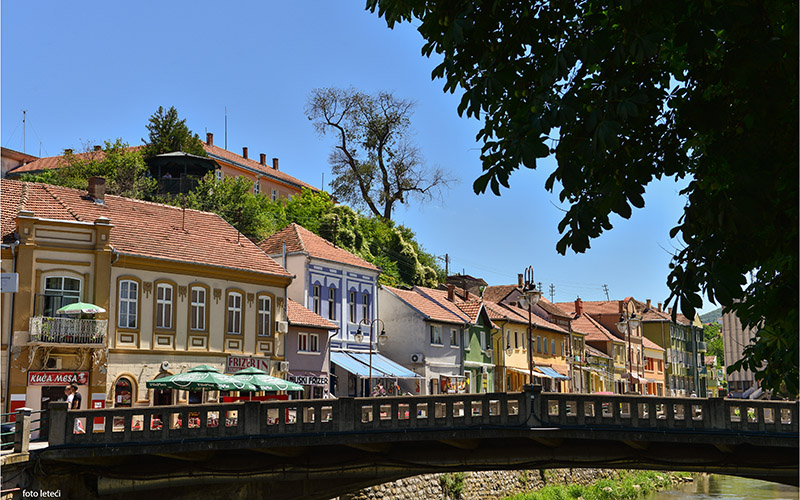
Centre of Knjaževac

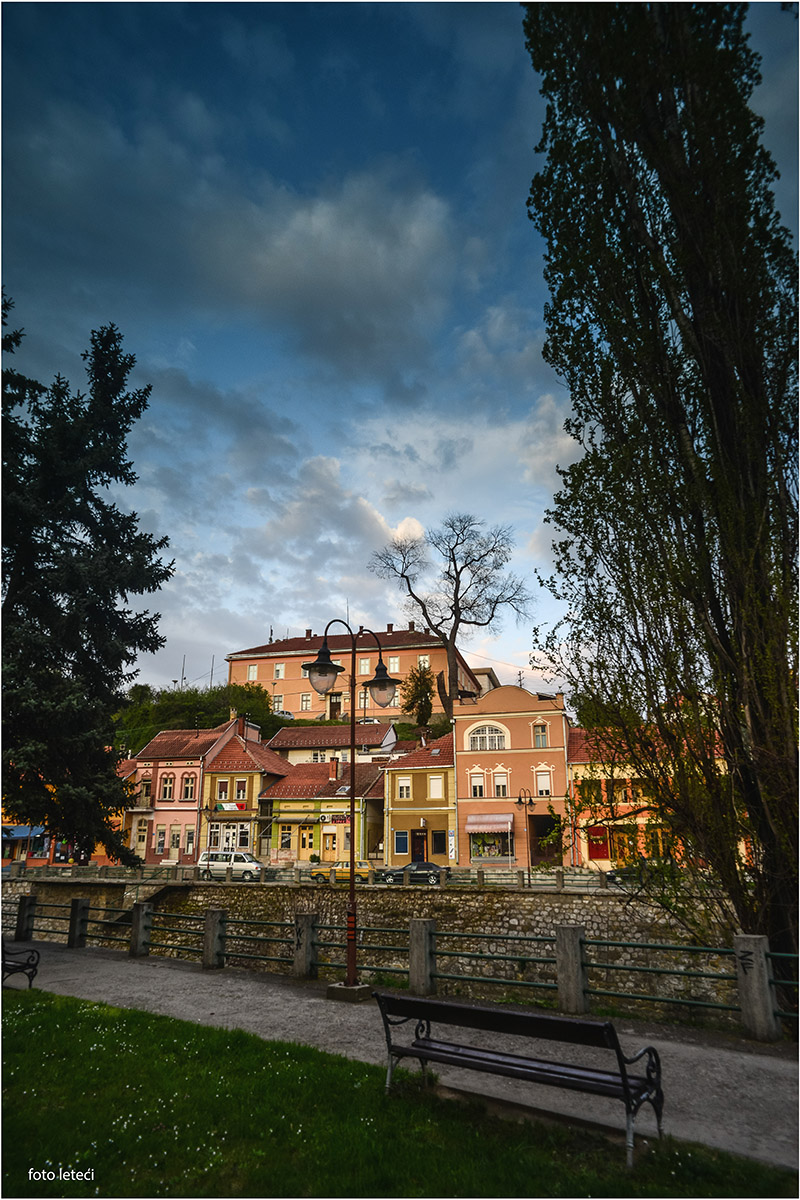
Knjaževac

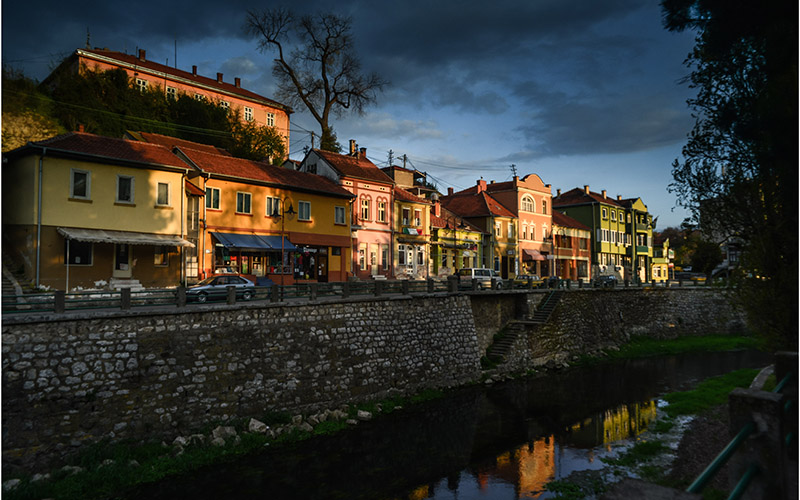
Knjaževac

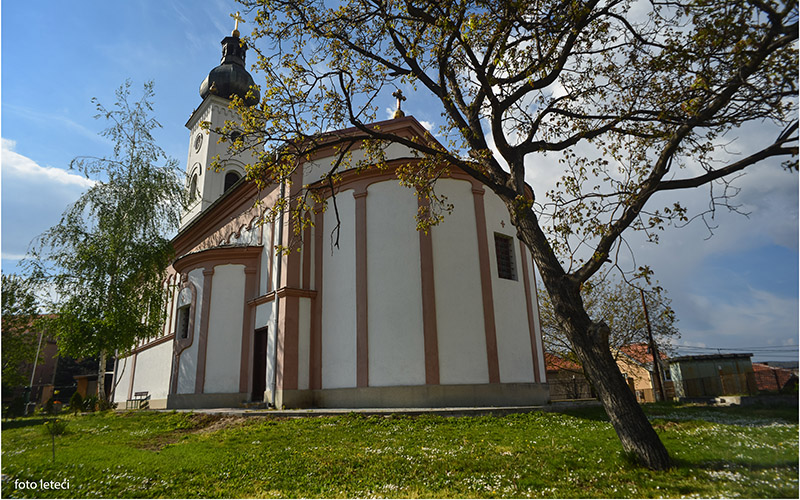
Church in Knjaževac

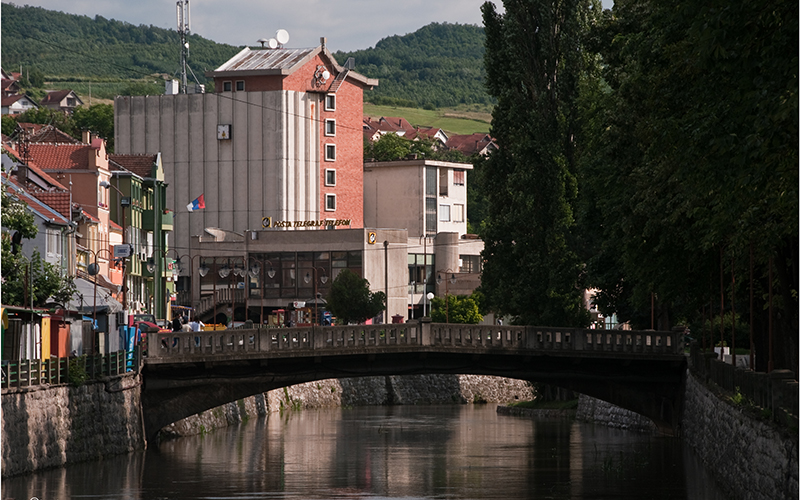
Knjaževac

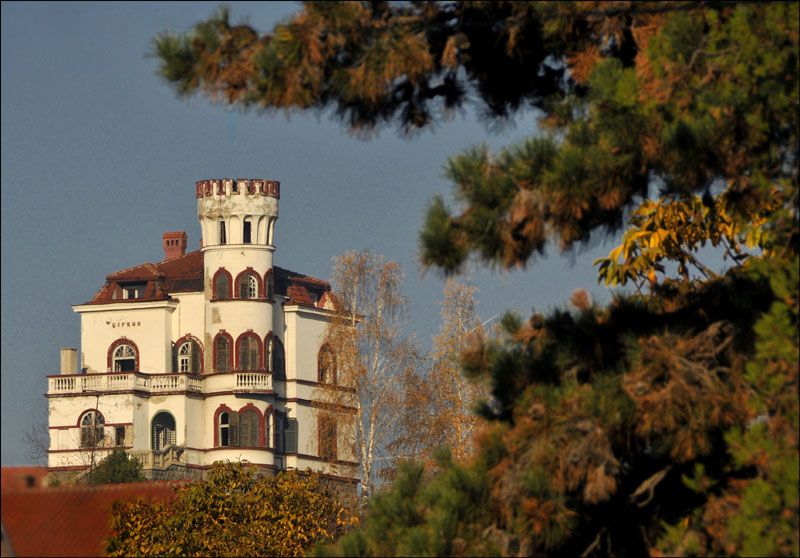
Villa in Knjaževac

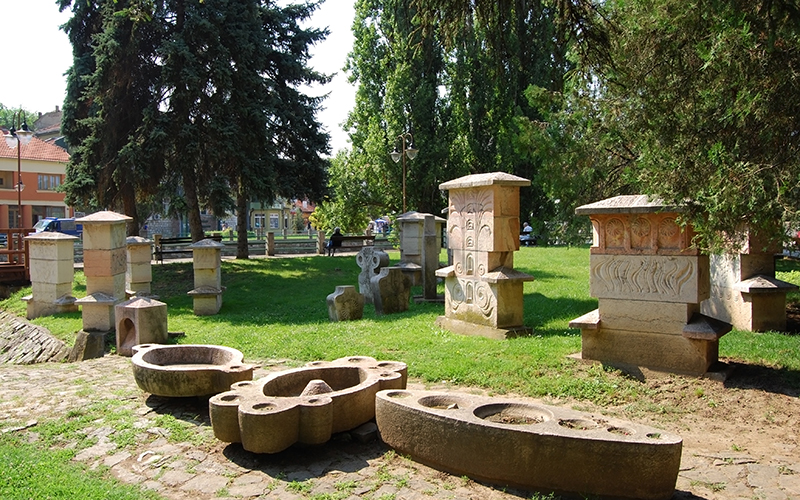
Memorial park in Knjaževac, dedicated to the soldiers fallen in the liberation wars 1803-1945

== See also ==
- List of places in Serbia
