= Šarbanovac =

Šarbanovac may refer to:

- Šarbanovac (Bor), a village in Serbia
- Šarbanovac (Knjaževac), a village in Serbia
- Šarbanovac (Sokobanja), a village in Serbia
