= Bukovik =

Bukovik (meaning 'beech forest') is a South Slavic toponym that may refer to:

== Bosnia and Herzegovina ==
- Bukovik (Breza), village in the municipality of Breza, Federation of Bosnia and Herzegovina
- Bukovik (Sokolac), village in the municipality of Sokolac, Republika Srpska
- Bukovik, a mountain ridge in Sarajevo's Ozren,

== Kosovo ==
- Bukovik (Gjilan), village in the municipality of Gjilan

== North Macedonia ==
- Bukoviḱ, village in the municipality of Saraj, city of Skopje
- Bukoviḱ (mountain) (or Bukovik)
- Bukovik (volcanic cone)
- Bukoviḱ (river)

== Serbia ==
- Bukovik (Aranđelovac), village in the municipality of Aranđelovac
- Bukovik (Prijepolje), village in the municipality of Prijepolje
- Bukovik (Nova Varoš), village in the municipality of Nova Varoš
- Bukovik (eastern Serbia), mountain east of Ražanj (894 m)
- Bukovik (central Serbia), mountain southeast of Gornji Milanovac (851 m)

== See also ==
- Bukoviḱ (disambiguation)
