= Bukoviḱ (disambiguation) =

Bukoviḱ is a village in the municipality of Saraj, North Macedonia.

Bukoviḱ may also refer to:

- Bukoviḱ (mountain), a mountain in North Macedonia
- Bukoviḱ (river), a river in North Macedonia

== See also ==
- Buković, a village in the municipality of Benkovac, Croatia.
- Bukovik (disambiguation).
