= Sokobanjska Moravica =

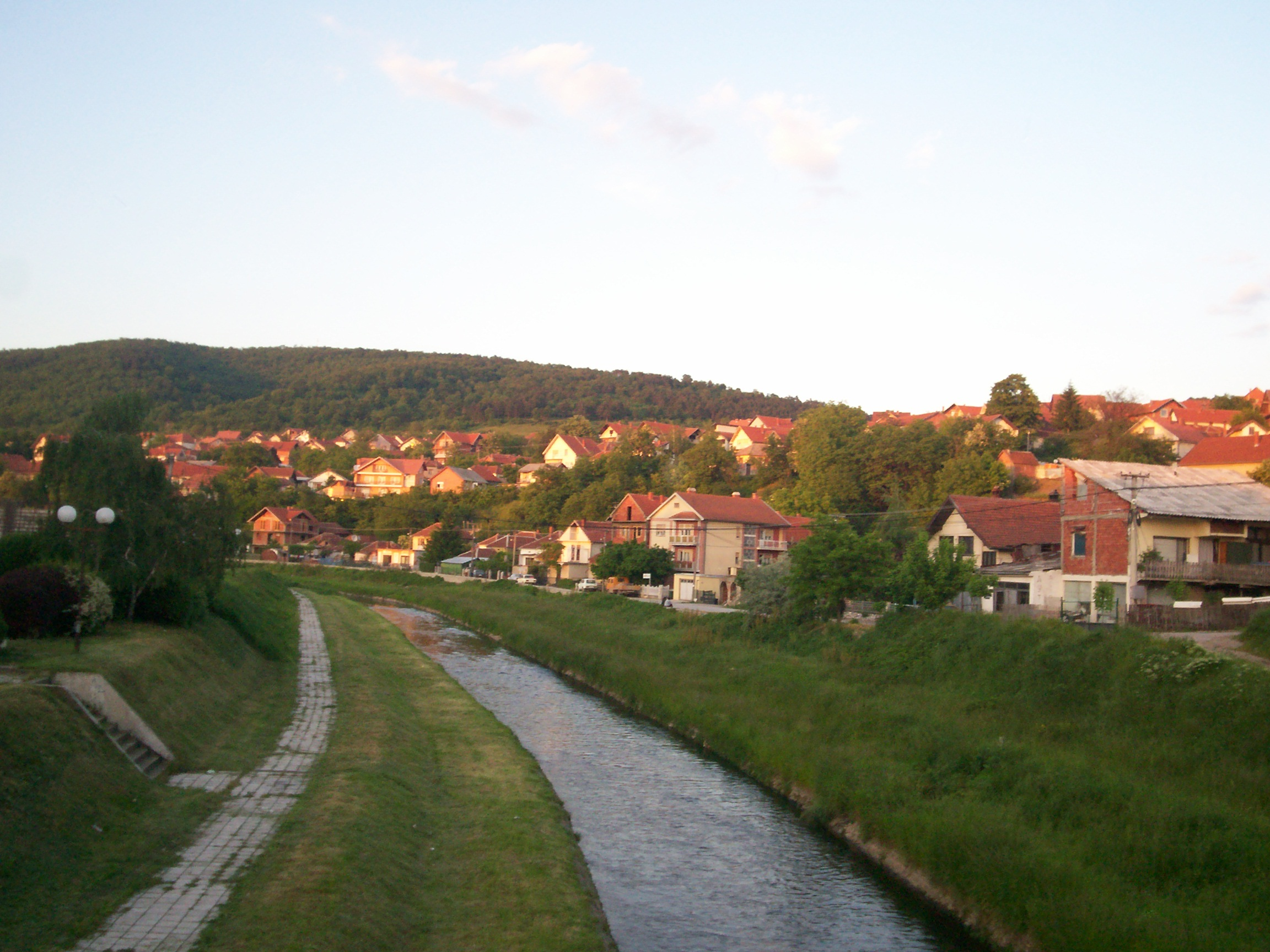
- Native name: Сокобањска Моравица (Serbian)

Location
- Country: Serbia

Physical characteristics
- Source
  - location: Devica mountain, eastern Serbia
- Mouth
  - location: Južna Morava at Aleksinac, Serbia
  - coordinates: 43°32′02″N 21°41′27″E
- Length: 58 km (36 mi)
- Basin size: 606 km^{2} (234 sq mi)

Basin features
- Progression: South Morava→ Great Morava→ Danube→ Black Sea

The Sokobanjska Moravica or simply Moravica (Serbian Cyrillic: Сокобањска Моравица) is a river in central eastern Serbia, a 58 km-long right tributary to the Južna Morava river.

== Devica and Ozren mountains ==
The Sokobanjska Moravica originates from the eastern slopes of the Devica mountain, near the village of Skrobnica. The river flows to the north, turns westward at the village of Levovik and enters the Banja region. The rivers flows between the northern slopes of the Devica and Ozren mountains (on the south) and southern slopes of the Rtanj mountain (on the north), next to the villages of Čitluk (including a coal mine), Vrela and Blendija, reaching the town of Sokobanja, a center of Sokobanja depression and of the whole Banja region.

== Bovan ==
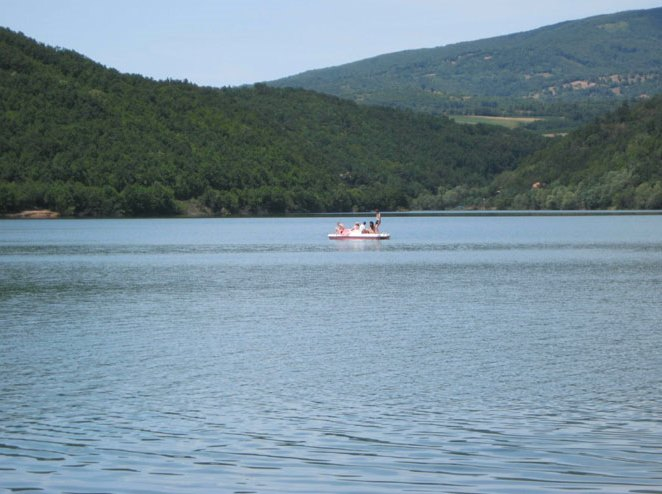
Lake Bovan

After the villages of Poružnica and Trubarevac, the Sokobanjska Moravica turns south, curving between the western tip of the Ozren and southern slopes of the Bukovik mountain. At the village of Bovan, the river is dammed, as part of the complex project of the Velika Morava river regulation. Artificial Bovan lake flooded the Bovan gorge carved by the river and is very popular local and regional tourist destination, especially among campers and fishermen, but the coastline is not put in order. The river continues to the south, in an inverse flow, and after the villages of Subotinac and Kraljevo, it empties into the Južna Morava at the town of Aleksinac. The lower section, below the dam, is 9 km long and highly protected "Fly Fishing Only" stretch, populated with native brown trout (Salmo trutta fario).

The Sokobanjska Moravica belongs to the Black Sea drainage basin, drains an area of 606 km² itself, and it is not navigable.
