= Oskoruša =

Coordinates: 44.408°N 20.971°E

Oskoruša is a hill close to the city of Smederevska Palanka, Serbia. The top of the hill is 265 metres (869 ft) above sea level.

== Description ==
From the top of the hill it is possible to see the city of Vršac to the north; the mountain range Kopaonik to the south at a distance of 210 kilometres (130 mi); the area close to the river Drina to the west; and the area near the city of Bor to the east at a distance of 180 kilometres (110 mi). Also visible are the mountain Rtanj, the mountain Devica near the city of Niš, the mountains Jastrebac, Avala, Kosmaj, Bukulja, Venčac, and Rudnik; and the cities of Požarevac, Kovin, Svilajnac, Velika Plana, Despotovac, Žabari, and Arandjelovac.

== History ==
Less than one mile away is the archaeological site at Medvednjak. Research has been conducted at Medvednjak by University of California, Los Angeles. It is assumed that Oskoruša was the site of a church that was destroyed in the 17th century by a landslide.
