= Sloga =

Serbian-American organization

Sloga translated from Serbian simply means "concord" in English. It is also a name of the Federation of United Serbs "Sloga" or Savez Sjedinjenih Srba "Sloga" formed in Cleveland, Ohio, in 1909 with the merger of three federations—the Serbian Orthodox Federation "Srbobran" of Pittsburgh, Pennsylvania, the First Serbian Benevolent Federation of Chicago, and the First Montenegrin Federation of Chicago. It was part of Serb fraternal movement in the diaspora, led by Michael Pupin with the support of Bishop Nikolaj Velimirović who visited the United States during the period of the federation's early beginnings.

Sloga's thousands of members were Serbs from different places in the Balkans and surrounding countries (then known as empires such as the Habsburg Monarchy to the north and north east and the Ottoman Empire to the south and south east of the Serbia), as well as some American-born, sons and daughters of the first settlers in North America in the 1800s. Their old homelands were eventually united into the Kingdom of Serbs, Croats and Slovenes after the Great War. In 1929 the country was renamed Yugoslavia. No different than the web and flow of all other ethnic American citizens of the time.

Members of "Sloga" federation at that time represented many branches of different benevolent societies throughout the United States of America and Canada. Many of these societies no longer exist, and most of the mining and industrial towns where the branches were located are no longer home to large numbers of America's Serbs. Today their descendants are scattered in big cities throughout the United States and Canada.

== Leaders of the Federation of United Serbs "Sloga" ==
- President: Michael Pupin, born in Idvor, Banat, then Austria-Hungary; member of the benevolent society Slovenski Jug (Slavic South) No. 150, New York City, New York.
- Vice President: Pavle H. Pavlović, born in Soko Banja, Serbia; member of the benevolent society Slovenski Jug (Slavic South) No. 150, New York City, New York.

== Main Source ==
- Copied and adapted from the 1919 "Sloga" federation's regular yearly almanac (Srpski narodni kalendar) which was entitled "Srbija" and in it contained a complete list of the above federation's officers.
