= Sokobanja =

Sokobanja Сокобања (Serbian)
- Town and municipality
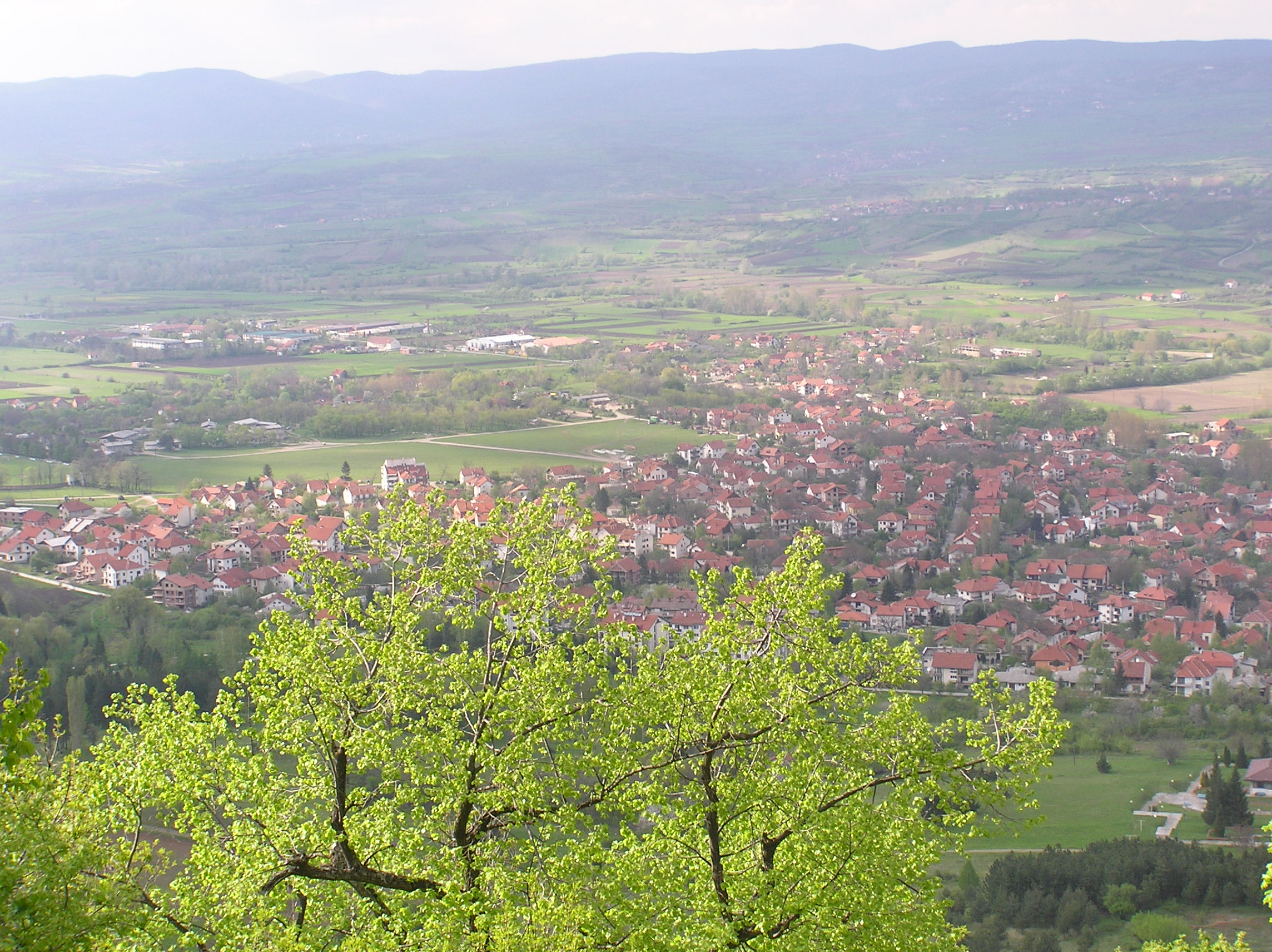
- View on Sokobanja

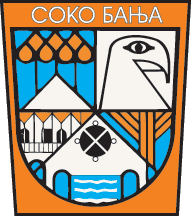
- Coat of arms

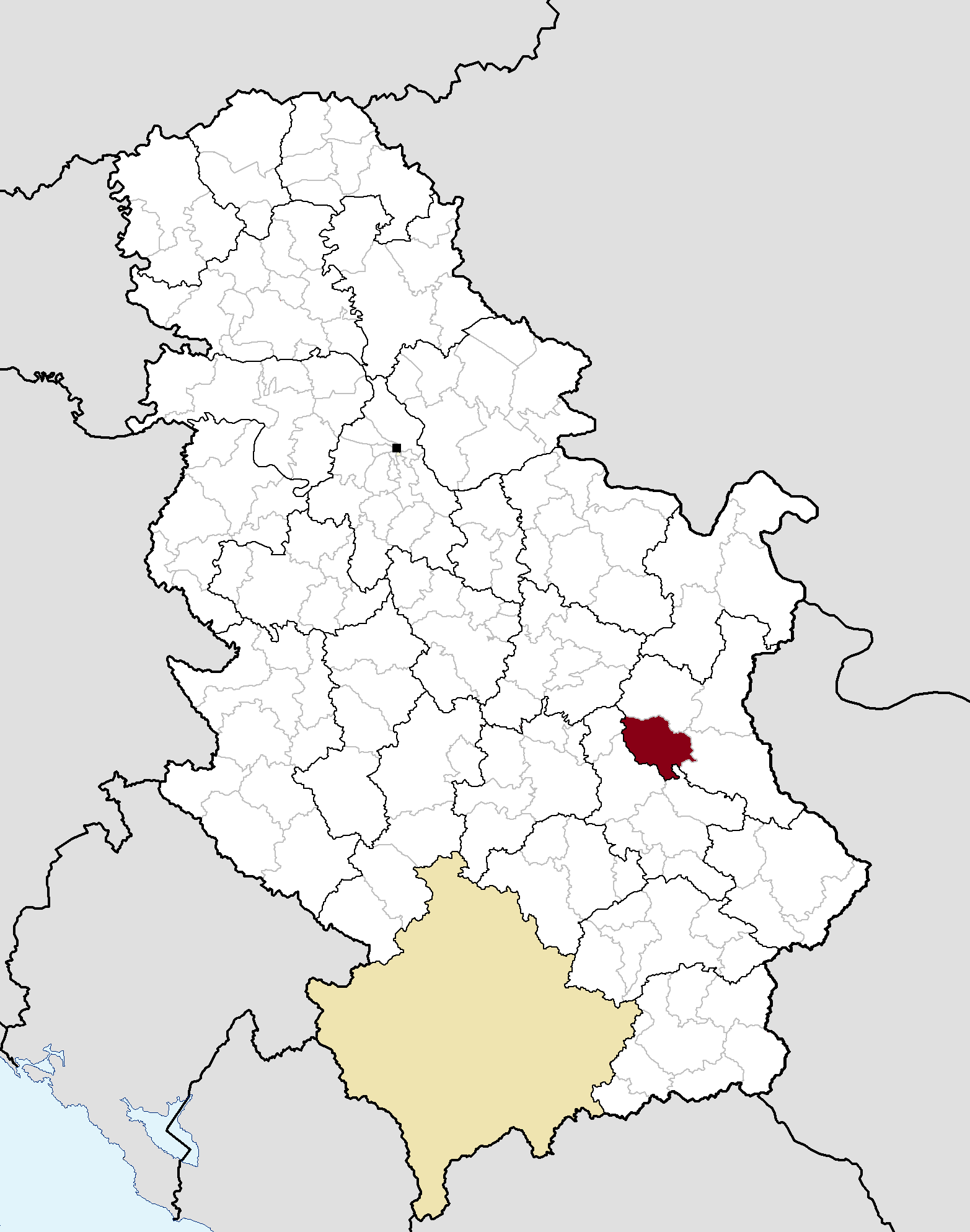
- Location of the municipality of Sokobanja within Serbia
- Coordinates: 43°39′N 21°52′E
- Country: Serbia
- Region: Southern and Eastern Serbia
- District: Zaječar
- Settlements: 25

Government
  - Mayor: Miodrag Nikolić (SNS)

Area
  - Municipality: 525 km^{2} (203 sq mi)
- Elevation: 369 m (1,211 ft)

Population (2022 census)
  - Town: 7,188
  - Municipality: 13,199
- Time zone: UTC+1 (CET)
  - Summer (DST): UTC+2 (CEST)
- Postal code: 18230
- Area code: +381(0)18
- Car plates: ZA
- Website: www.opstinasokobanja.com

Sokobanja (Serbian Cyrillic: Сокобања, pronounced [sɔ̂kɔbaɲa]) is a spa town and municipality located in the Zaječar District of the eastern Serbia. As of 2022, the population of the town is 7,188, while population of the municipality is 13,199.

== Geography ==
Sokobanja is one of the most popular tourist resorts in Serbia. It is situated in the southern part of Sokobanja valley, surrounded by mountains Ozren, Devica, Janior, Rtanj, and Bukovik. The Moravica River runs through Sokobanja. It creates a canyon just 2 km before entering the town. Remains of the Roman and later medieval Serbian fortress Sokograd stand today near the canyon of Moravica.

The Moravica was known for the clear water and the abundance of the crayfish. The 1945 edition of the Politika newspaper reports about the export of the crayfish from Sokobanja, stating that "they were transported from Moravica by airplanes to Paris, London and Monte Carlo".

Artificial Lake Bovan on the Moravica is situated some 10 minutes drive to the west of Sokobanja. Sokobanja is on elevation of about 369 m, although some parts of the town are on higher elevation.

=== Climate ===
Climate data for Sokobanja (2018-2025)
Month	Jan	Feb	Mar	Apr	May	Jun	Jul	Aug	Sep	Oct	Nov	Dec	Year
Record high °C (°F)	19.0 (66.2)	21.5 (70.7)	28.2 (82.8)	31.0 (87.8)	33.7 (92.7)	37.7 (99.9)	41.8 (107.2)	39.4 (102.9)	35.6 (96.1)	29.8 (85.6)	25.9 (78.6)	21.0 (69.8)	41.8 (107.2)
Mean daily maximum °C (°F)	5.8 (42.4)	8.7 (47.7)	13.1 (55.6)	18.3 (64.9)	22.2 (72.0)	27.9 (82.2)	30.5 (86.9)	30.5 (86.9)	25.1 (77.2)	18.8 (65.8)	11.7 (53.1)	7.2 (45.0)	18.3 (65.0)
Daily mean °C (°F)	1.5 (34.7)	3.5 (38.3)	6.9 (44.4)	11.6 (52.9)	15.9 (60.6)	20.9 (69.6)	22.9 (73.2)	22.8 (73.0)	17.5 (63.5)	12.1 (53.8)	6.7 (44.1)	3.2 (37.8)	12.1 (53.8)
Mean daily minimum °C (°F)	−2.1 (28.2)	−0.9 (30.4)	1.5 (34.7)	5.3 (41.5)	10.0 (50.0)	14.0 (57.2)	15.5 (59.9)	15.8 (60.4)	11.2 (52.2)	6.4 (43.5)	2.7 (36.9)	0.1 (32.2)	6.6 (43.9)
Record low °C (°F)	−12.5 (9.5)	−11.8 (10.8)	−14.0 (6.8)	−4.5 (23.9)	2.6 (36.7)	5.4 (41.7)	8.1 (46.6)	5.8 (42.4)	−0.8 (30.6)	−2.7 (27.1)	−8.3 (17.1)	−11.3 (11.7)	−14.0 (6.8)
Source: vreme.in.rs

== History ==
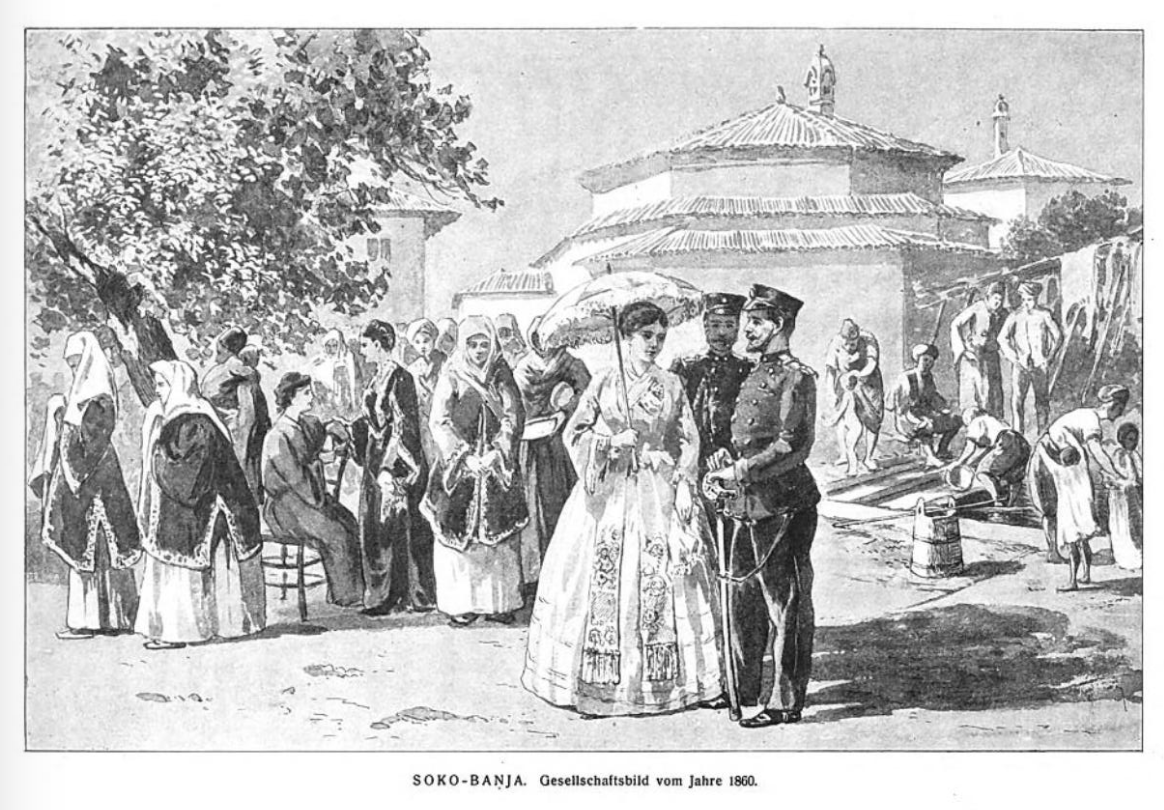
Sokobanja in 1860 by Felix Philipp Kanitz

The settlement changed name a lot during its history, but from the Roman times it was always connected to its spa function (Serbian banja): Balnea, Banja, Velika Banja ("Great Spa"), Aleksinačka Banja ("Aleksinac Spa"), Sokol Banja.

== Tourism ==
Sokobanja, as both the thermal and air spa, is one of the most popular tourist resorts in Serbia.

Satirist Branislav Nušić coined the rhyme Sokobanja, Soko-grad, dođeš mator, odeš mlad ("Sokobanja, Sokograd, you come old, you leave young"). He wrote it on a postcard manufactured by his friend so that he could boost the sales. After being printed in the Politika newspaper on 7 July 1934, the catchphrase became popular, surviving till today as the trademark of Sokobanja, inspiring several songs.

=== Spa ===
There are remains of the Roman thermae: wooden foundations, bricks, mosaics and round bathtubs. During the Ottoman period, the Roman foundations were used for the 16th century hamam. The Turks kept the original round shape of the pools as in hamams they are usually square-shaped. Above each pool, there is a dome with holes which functions as the natural ventilation. Ottoman defter from 1560 mentions the repairs of the hamam. In the 18th century, Samuel von Schmettau wrote about the marble baths.

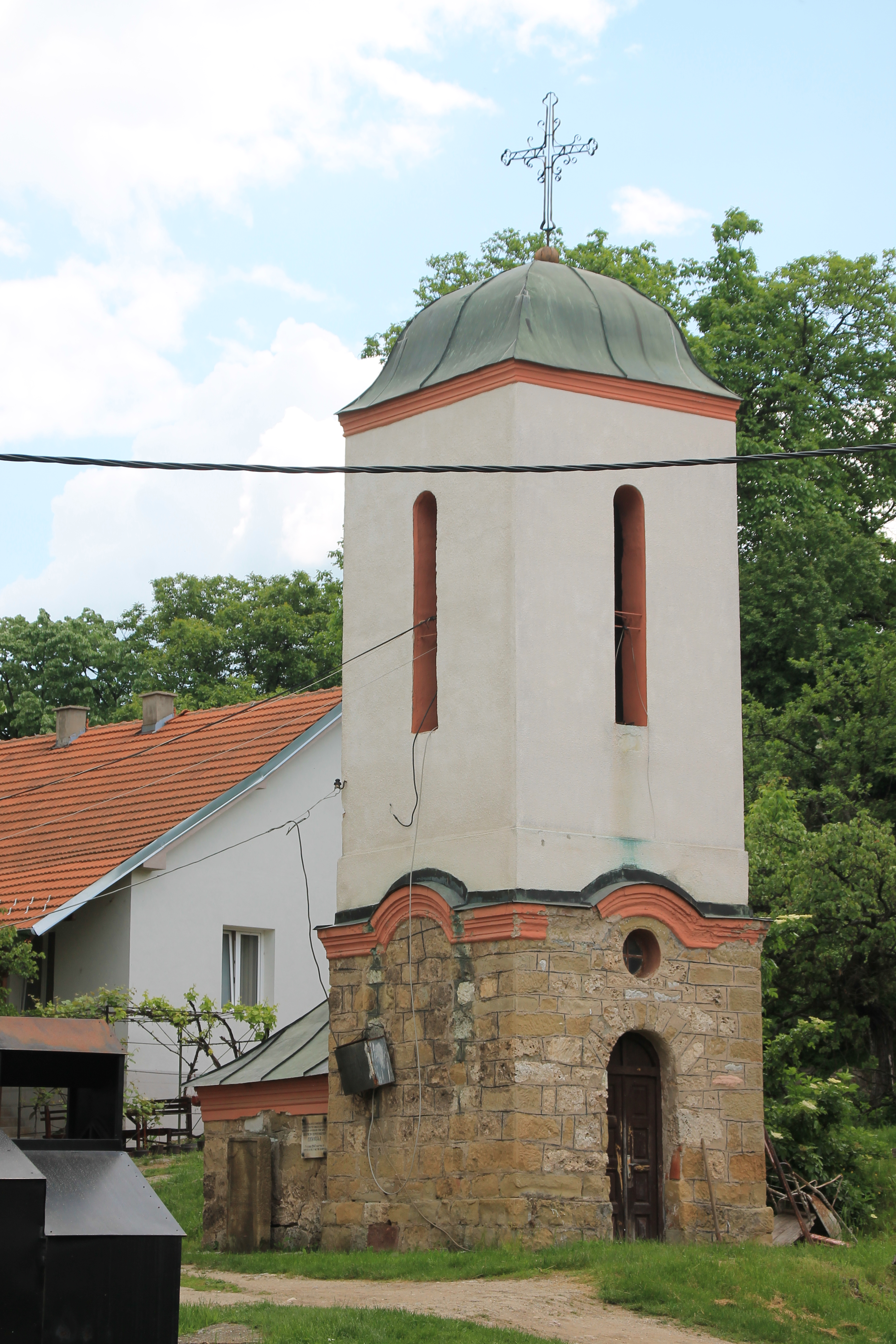
Church of the Transfiguration of the Lord in 2023

The first physician to the spa was appointed in 1833 by the Serbian ruling prince Miloš Obrenović, only 20 days after the town was liberated from the Ottomans. It was a surgeon Georgije Đorđe Novaković, originally Leopold Ehrlich, a Jew from Galicia, who switched to Serbian Orthodox Church after moving to Serbia. At that time, he was only one of three physicians in entire Serbia, not counting the military ambulances.

In 1834, Prince Miloš ordered the mineral waters from Sokobanja to be sent to Vienna, Austria, for testing which confirmed the positive healing effect of the water. In 1835, on prince's invitation, German geologist August von Herder among other thermal springs and mining localities, visited Sokobanja. He compared its waters to those from the Austrian spa Bad Gastein. In 1837 Prince Miloš ordered the construction of hospital (špitalj) in Sokobanja, with "20 rooms with floors", including the accommodation for the guests, physicians, and hamam staff.

On 21 June 1837, Prince Miloš signed an order for a sergeant major Lazarević from the Military-police office in Kragujevac to be sent to Sokobanja for a healing treatment. This date is today considered as the starting date of the spa tourism in Serbia. Prince renovated and expanded the hamam and appointed Austrian doctor Leopold Ehrlich as the first spa doctor. Prince personally visited the spa a lot and built several other objects, like the Prince Miloš Fountain, on the road to Aleksinac, Miloš' Konak in downtown Sokobanja, today a restaurant, and Miloš' bathtub in the hammam. The prince's bathtub, which still in use today just as the entire hammam complex, is short but deep, has its own tap and is placed in a separate room. There are two other pools, "male" and "female", with hot water from the underground springs.

The spa became quite popular among the cultural elite and was visited by writers, poets, painters, sculptors, actors, directors. Apart from Nušić, it was visited by Jovan Cvijić, Isidora Sekulić, Stevan Sremac and Meša Selimović, while the Nobelist author Ivo Andrić draw a graphic of the town. During World War II, Andrić moved from Belgrade to Sokobanja in 1942 for a while. He originally stayed in the villa Mon repos and then moved to "Bota", which is today within the hospital complex. According to Andrić's diary, during his stay in the spa, he finished the short story Snake and began writing some of his most important works: novels The Bridge on the Drina and Woman from Sarajevo and short story Jelena, the woman of my dream. Re-visiting Sokobanja and the villa "Bota" in 1973, Andrić wrote: "I am fearful, this place will become famous. The world will rush in and I will have to run away from here and try to find a new spa. But where can I find beauty and peace like this?".

The hamam in Sokobanja is the only still functioning such facility in eastern Serbia. Under the name Staro banjsko kupatilo ("Old spa bath") it is protected by the state and declared a cultural monument. It is colloquially also called the Roman Bath, the Turkish Bath or the Amam (the word "hamam" as pronounced in the eastern Serbian dialects that feature H-dropping). The venue served as the setting for the film Zona Zamfirova in 2002. The bath was renovated in 2005.

Water from springs in Sokobanja are hipertermal and hipotermal. Hipertermal water contains microelements and small amounts of radioactive Radon and Kalium. Radioactivity on spring "Park" is 186±10 mBq/l if we talk about Alpha particles and 283±17 mBq/l from Beta particles. The illnesses which are being treated in the spa include asthma, bronchitis, emphysema, respiratory infections, allergies in children, cardiovascular diseases, rheumatism, neurological and gynecological illnesses, physical and psychic exhaustion, etc. In September 2023 construction of the heating pipeline which would conduct hot spring water from the Ozren mountain to the town began. The grid will be used for the heating of public buildings.

=== Soko Grad ===
Soko Grad (Соко Град), also known as Sokolac, was a medieval city and fortress 2 km (1.2 mi) east of Sokobanja. The fortress was declared a Monument of Culture of Great Importance in 1982, and it is protected by Republic of Serbia.

The fortress originates from the Roman, early Christian period. It was founded in the 6th century during the reign of Emperor Justinian I, to prevent incursions of Pannonian Avars and Slavs into the Balkan Peninsula. In 1172, it was occupied by Stefan Nemanja and became part of the medieval Serbian state. There is evidence that the fortress was razed during Stefan Nemanja's rule, as part of the prosecution of the Bogumils.

The fort was rebuilt and expanded in the late 13th and early 14th centuries on the foundations of the Roman fort. It was mentioned later during the reign of Despot Stefan Lazarević. The Ottoman Empire occupied it in 1398. The town was destroyed in 1413 by the Ottomans during the 1402–13 civil war, in the battle between Musa Çelebi and the local Turkish chieftain Hamuz Beg. Today the only visible remains of the upper town are the gate, walls, and three towers.

=== Vrmdža ===
In the village of Vrmdža, 12 km (7.5 mi) to the north, there are remains of another fort, Town of Vrmdža (Vrmdžanski grad). It was also originally a Roman fortress built during the rule of Emperor Justinian I and was also destroyed in 1413.

The village was revived in the 21st century, with the growing tourism on the Rtanj mountain. The villagers began to revitalize the objects, with the help of the village diaspora from the United States, Switzerland and Italy. Some immigrants returned with families, but also some foreigners moved their families to Vrmdža, renovating over 40 houses. The old school, built in 1851 and operational until 1863, and then being turned into the monastery's konak, has been adapted into the museum. There are also a monument to the soldiers of World War I and an unusual medieval church. Dating from the 13th century, it has only one room and frescoes on the ceiling. It was reconstructed and annexed in 1819.

The locality is close to the former Tsarigrad Road, which connected Belgrade and Istanbul. Next to the road are two rocks, named Nikolina stena and Devojačka stena after the folk tales. The first one was named after a young man Nikola who slipped and got killed after trying to pick a flower for his girlfriend, while the other ("Girl's") was named after a girl who committed suicide by jumping of it so that she wouldn't be ravaged by the Ottomans. There is also a Vrmdža Lake, old renovated watermill, wooden bridge over the Oravica stream, and a sawmill.

=== Other features ===
Other attractions include swimming in the Moravica river and the Lake Bovan, which is especially popular among fishermen, galleries, museums, various concerts and festivities, hiking, wellness centers, hotels, aqua park, saunas, etc. Festivals include "Saint John the Herbs-picker" (in July; dedicated to the medicinal herbs picking on the surrounding mountains of Ozren, Rtanj, and Devica), "Green Heart Fest" (in July; the rock and house music festival) and "Marathon of the wishes" (in September). Since 1983, a "Golden hands" cooking festival has been held annually in July. Only the old, traditional local meals are prepared. Hiking is organized on the Ozren, Rtanj, Devica, and Bukovik mountains, while the popular excursion sites are the Sesalac cave, Očno, Kalinovica and Lepterija, known for the natural phenomenon, an apparent image of the Mother of God in the boulder.

In the neighborhood of Gradašnica, on the river of the same name, there were 13 watermills, built from the early 19th century. They all went out of service by the 1960s. One of them has been renovated and became operational again, but only for the touristic purposes so that visitors can grind the cereals and knead dough themselves. On Ozren Mountain there is a large, single boulder in the middle of the vast meadow. It has been called the "Stone of love" as, allegedly, those who exchange kisses of vows sitting on the rock will stay together forever. According to the folk story, military commander and rebel Hajduk-Veljko and female hajduk Čučuk Stana, exchanged vows at this location.

Special hospitals for lung diseases (Hospital for non-specific lung diseases, founded in 1978) and ophthalmology are situated on Ozren mountain, surrounded by the forest. The lung hospital is a legal successor of the original, 1837 hospital. Major boost to the tourism was opening of the Hotel Sunce ("Sun") in 1977. The edifice with specific design is located next to the Moravica river in the eastern section of Sokobanja. The town center of Sokobanja is home to the 19th-century buildings of elementary school and Serbian Orthodox church.

In the village of Jošanica, 15 km (9.3 mi) to the northwest, there is a Church of the Dormition of the Mother of God. Founded in the 11th century, it is the oldest existing church in eastern Serbia. Closer to Sokobanja, on the Ozren mountain, there is a Jermenčić Monastery, founded in the 14th century by the Armenians who were fleeing the invading Ottomans. Southeast of Sokobanja, on the slopes of Ozren, there is a seasonal Ripaljka waterfall. It exists only during the spring after the snow melts on the mountain. Already by May, it is usually dry.

== Demographics ==
Historical population
Year	Pop.	±% p.a.
1948	23,733	—
1953	24,621	+0.74%
1961	24,285	−0.17%
1971	23,932	−0.15%
1981	23,394	−0.23%
1991	21,948	−0.64%
2002	18,571	−1.51%
2011	16,021	−1.63%
2022	13,199	−1.75%

According to 2022 census of population, there were 13,199 inhabitants in the municipality and 7,188 in the town and municipal seat. The area has been depopulating for decades. The number of inhabitants in the municipality peaked in 1953 (pop. 24,621), while the largest population in the town was recorded in 1991 (pop. 8,439).

== Settlements ==
Aside from the town of Sokobanja, the municipality consists of the following villages (2022 population):

- Beli Potok (pop. 181)
- Blendija (pop. 243)
- Bogdinac (pop. 112)
- Cerovica (pop. 11)
- Čitluk (pop. 429)
- Dugo Polje (pop. 359)
- Jezero (pop. 219)
- Jošanica (pop. 499)
- Levovik (pop. 102)
- Milušinac (pop. 211)
- Mužinac (pop. 288)
- Nikolinac (pop. 214)
- Novo Selo (pop. 19)
- Poružnica (pop. 258)
- Radenkovac (pop. 40)
- Resnik (pop. 593)
- Rujevica (pop. 121)
- Sesalac (pop. 130)
- Trgovište (pop. 211)
- Trubarevac (pop. 390)
- Vrbovac (pop. 375)
- Vrmdža (pop. 387)
- Šarbanovac (pop. 294)
- Žučkovac (pop. 325)

== Economy ==
The following table gives a preview of total number of registered people employed in legal entities per their core activity (as of 2022):

Activity	Total
Agriculture, forestry and fishing	67
Mining and quarrying	460
Manufacturing	217
Electricity, gas, steam and air conditioning supply	6
Water supply; sewerage, waste management and remediation activities	77
Construction	81
Wholesale and retail trade, repair of motor vehicles and motorcycles	456
Transportation and storage	100
Accommodation and food services	531
Information and communication	24
Financial and insurance activities	31
Real estate activities	15
Professional, scientific and technical activities	101
Administrative and support service activities	56
Public administration and defense; compulsory social security	182
Education	245
Human health and social work activities	587
Arts, entertainment and recreation	36
Other service activities	55
Individual agricultural workers	248
Total	3,577

== Sports ==
The local football club is Ozren, who have competed in Serbia's third tier.

== Gallery ==
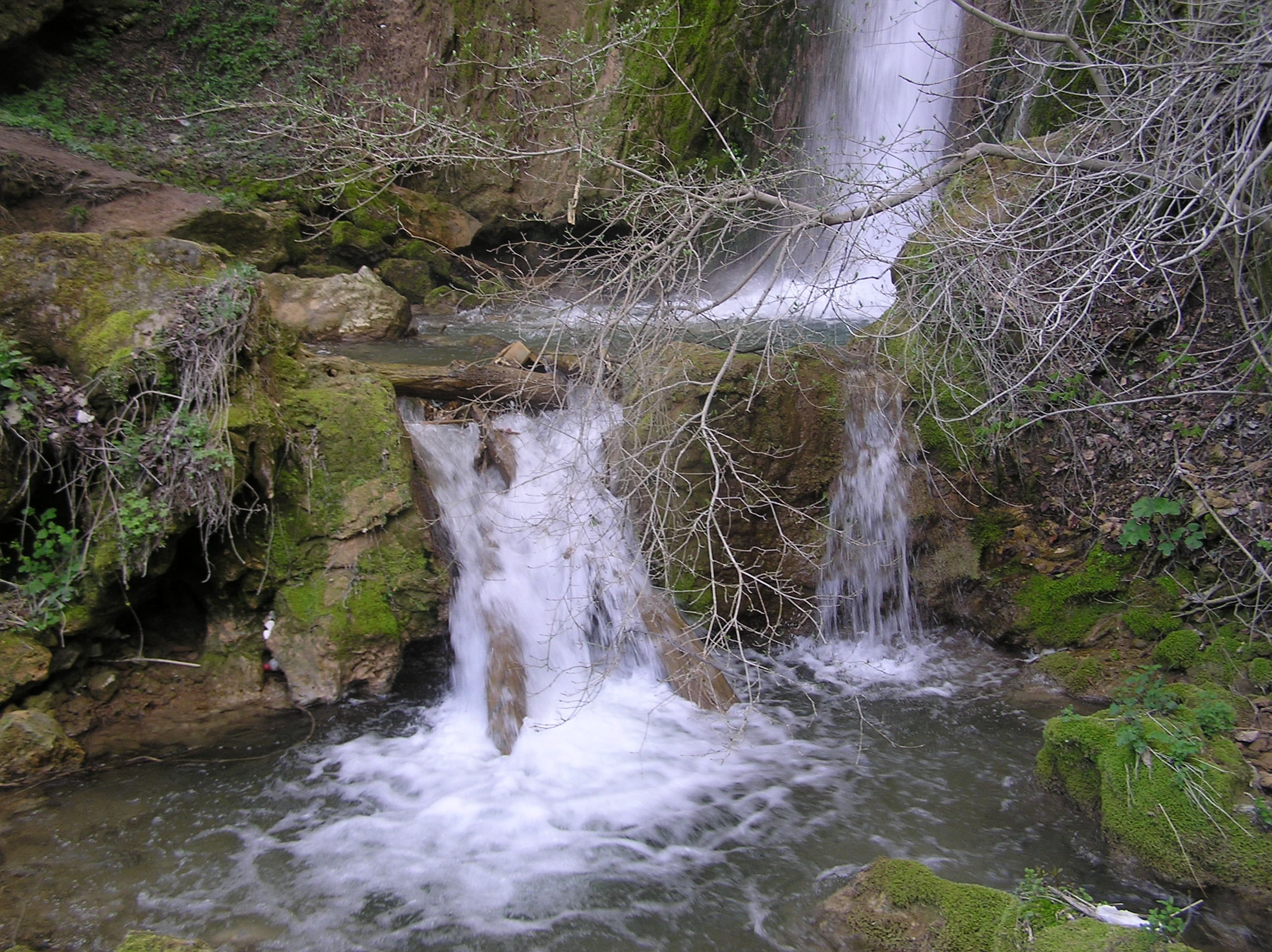
Waterfall "Ripaljka" at Ozren mountain

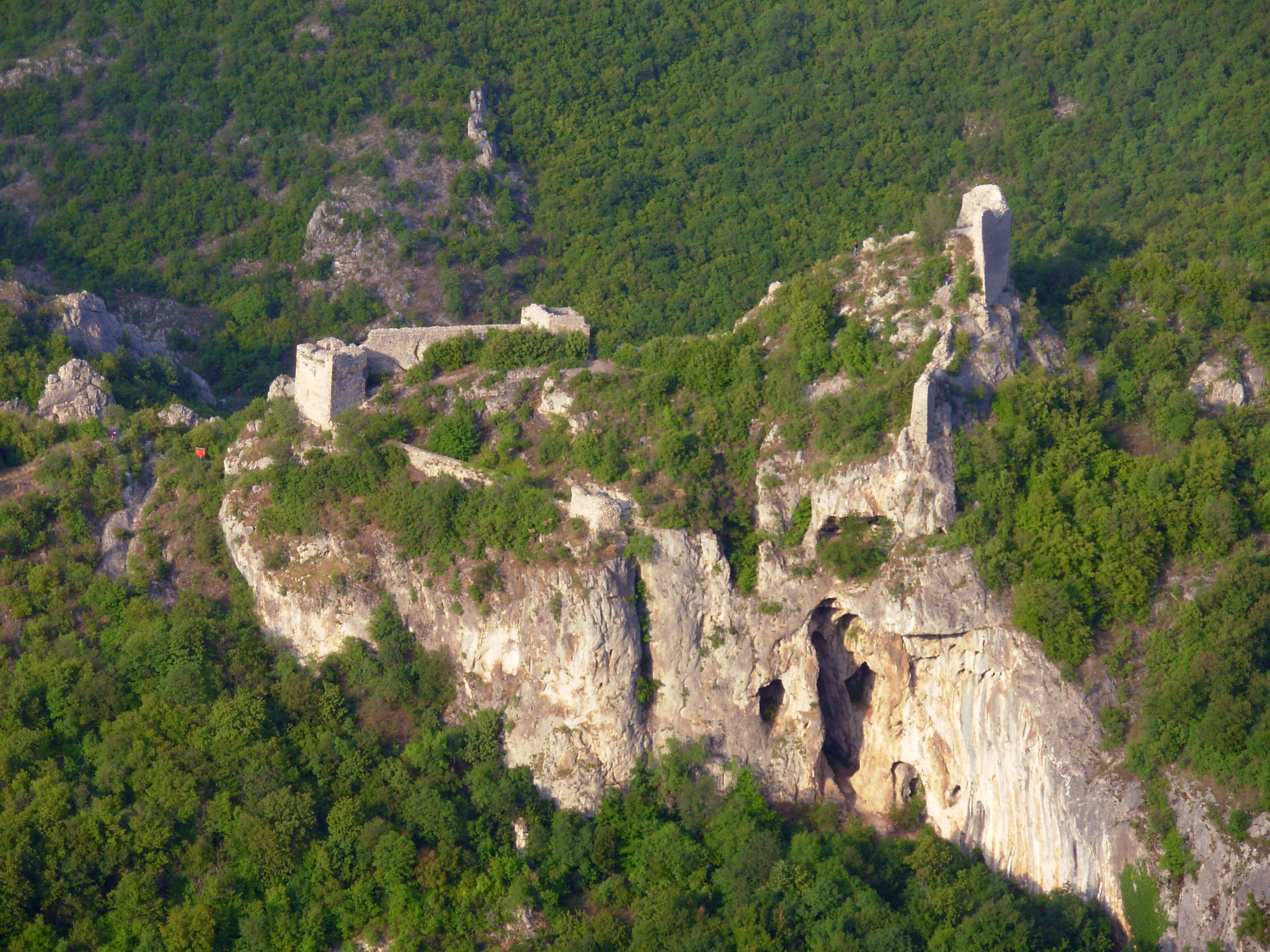
Overview of Sokograd

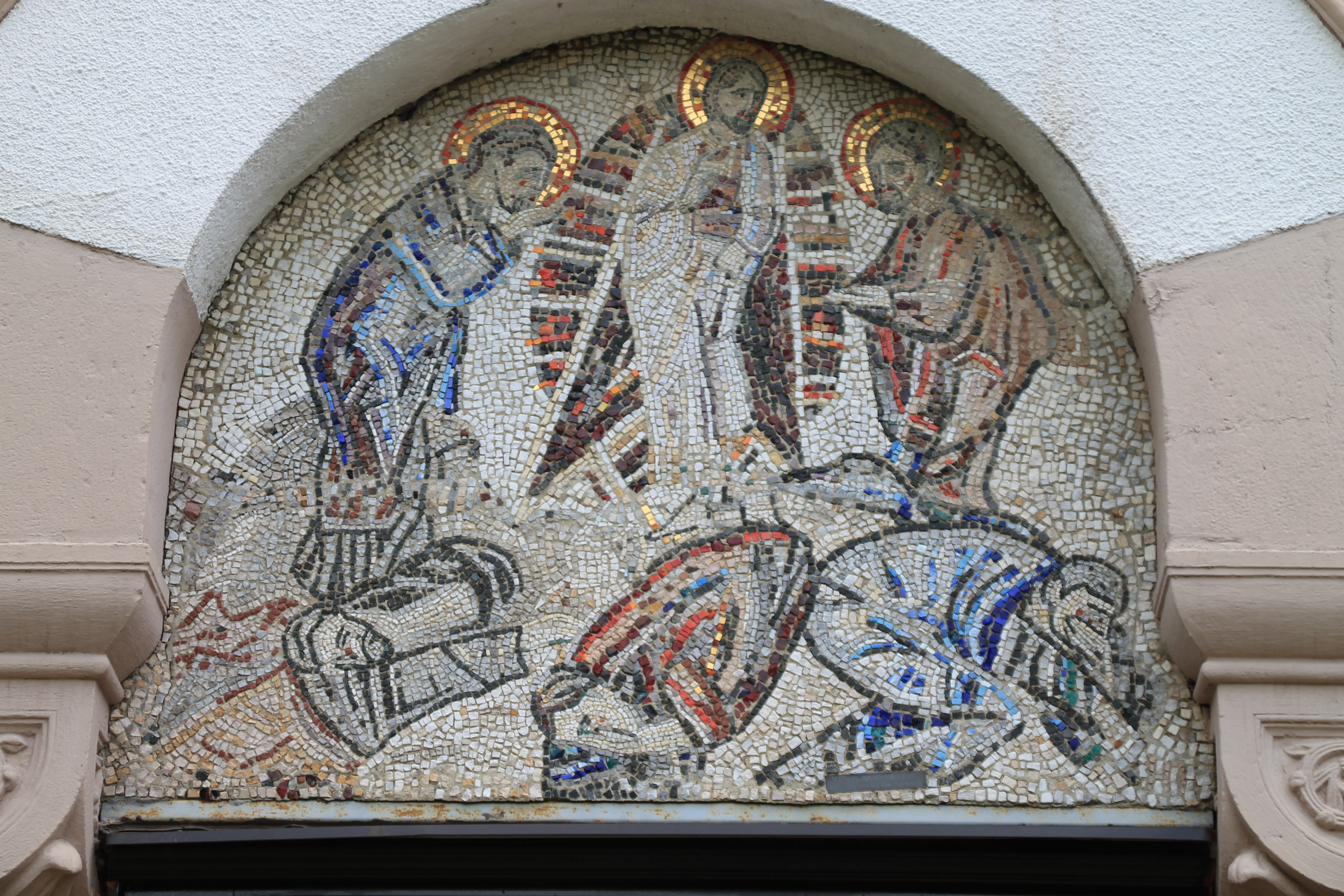
Church of the Transfiguration of the Lord

== See also ==
- List of spa towns in Serbia
- List of places in Serbia
- Mihailo Jovanović (metropolitan)
