= Cerovica (Sokobanja) =

Cerovica Церовица
- Village
- Location within Serbia
- Coordinates: 43°36′37″N 22°03′30″E
- Country: Serbia
- District: Zaječar District
- Municipality: Sokobanja

Population (2002)
  - Total: 54
- Time zone: UTC+1 (CET)
  - Summer (DST): UTC+2 (CEST)

Cerovica is a village in the municipality of Sokobanja, Serbia. According to the 2002 census, the village has a population of 54 people.
