= Rujevica, Serbia =

Rujevica Рујевица
- Village
- Location within Serbia
- Coordinates: 43°41′48″N 21°54′14″E
- Country: Serbia
- Region: Southern and Eastern Serbia
- District: Zaječar
- Municipality: Sokobanja
- Elevation: 1,224 ft (373 m)

Population (2011)
  - Total: 193
- Time zone: UTC+1 (CET)
  - Summer (DST): UTC+2 (CEST)

Rujevica is a village in the municipality of Sokobanja, Serbia. According to the 2011 census, the village has a population of 193 inhabitants.

== Population ==
Population of Rujevica
1948	1953	1961	1971	1981	1991	2002	2011
463	468	434	434	397	337	260	193
