= Levovik =

- Village
- Location within Serbia
- Coordinates: 43°37′10″N 22°02′32″E
- Country: Serbia
- District: Zaječar District
- Municipality: Sokobanja

Population (2002)
  - Total: 162
- Time zone: UTC+1 (CET)
  - Summer (DST): UTC+2 (CEST)

Levovik is a village in the municipality of Sokobanja, Serbia. According to the 2002 census, the village has a population of 162 people.
