= Milušinac =

- Village
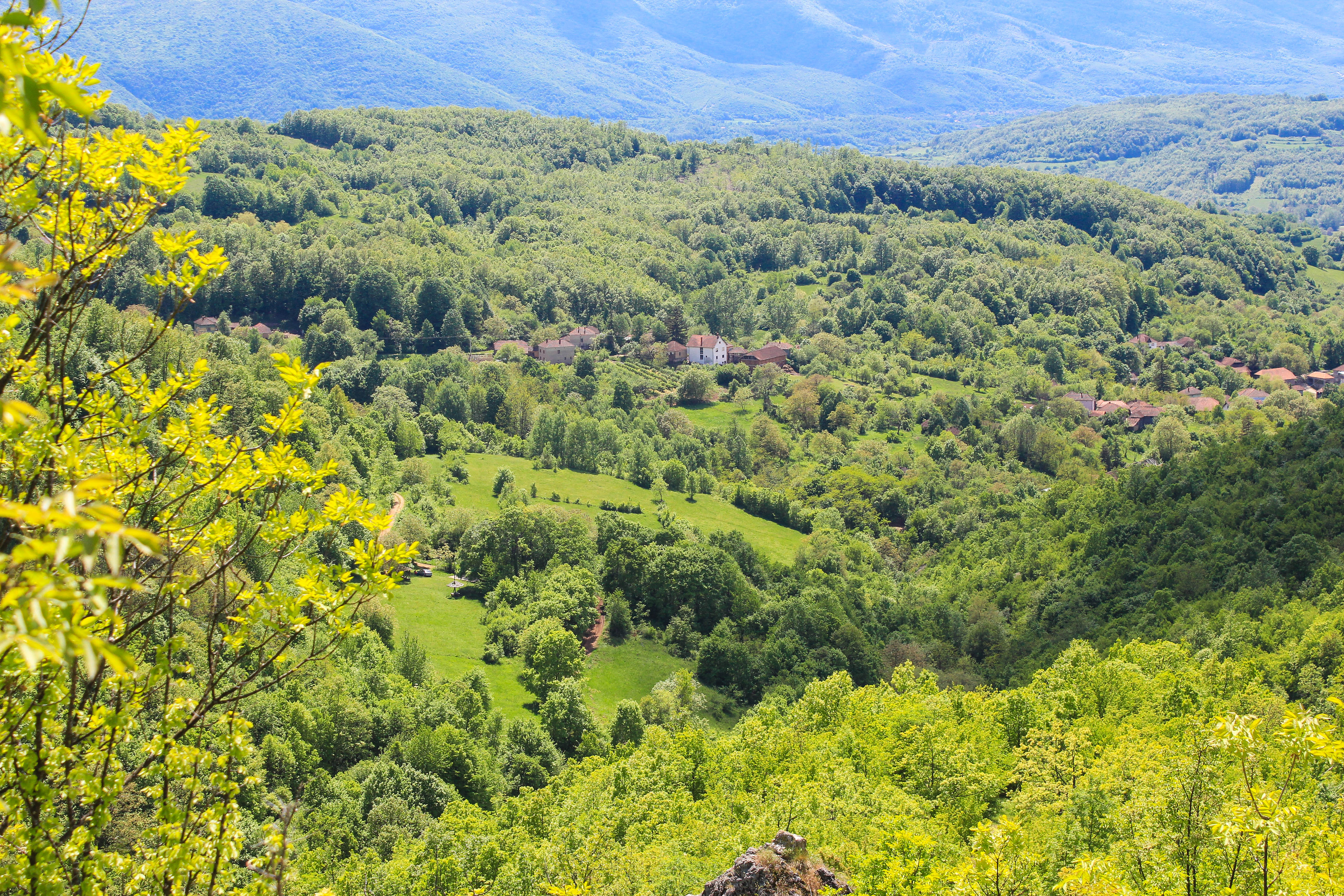

- Location within Serbia
- Coordinates: 43°40′12″N 22°00′58″E
- Country: Serbia
- District: Zaječar District
- Municipality: Sokobanja

Population (2002)
  - Total: 382
- Time zone: UTC+1 (CET)
  - Summer (DST): UTC+2 (CEST)

Milušinac is a village in the municipality of Sokobanja, Serbia. According to the 2002 census, the village has a population of 382 people.
