= Vrbovac (Sokobanja) =

Vrbovac Врбовац
- Village
- Location within Serbia
- Coordinates: 43°41′18″N 21°44′51″E
- Country: Serbia
- District: Zaječar District
- Municipality: Sokobanja

Population (2002)
  - Total: 598
- Time zone: UTC+1 (CET)
  - Summer (DST): UTC+2 (CEST)

Vrbovac is a village in the municipality of Sokobanja, Serbia. According to the 2002 census, the village has a population of 598 people.
