= Novo Selo (Sokobanja) =

Novo Selo Ново Село
- Village
- Location within Serbia
- Coordinates: 43°33′57″N 21°55′15″E
- Country: Serbia
- District: Zaječar District
- Municipality: Sokobanja

Population (2002)
  - Total: 56
- Time zone: UTC+1 (CET)
  - Summer (DST): UTC+2 (CEST)

Novo Selo is a village in the municipality of Sokobanja, Serbia. According to the 2002 census, the village has a population of 56 people. The etymology of the village comes from Slavic languages meaning new village, Novo Selo.
