= Dugo Polje (Sokobanja) =

Coordinates: 43.6242°N 21.9511°E

- Village
- Interactive map of Dugo Polje
- Country: Serbia
- District: Zaječar District
- Municipality: Sokobanja

Population (2002)
  - Total: 690
- Time zone: UTC+1 (CET)
  - Summer (DST): UTC+2 (CEST)

Dugo Polje is a village in the municipality of Sokobanja, Serbia. According to the 2002 census, the village has a population of 690 people.
