= Trgovište (Sokobanja) =

Trgovište Трговиште
- Village
- Location within Serbia
- Coordinates: 43°41′08″N 21°49′29″E
- Country: Serbia
- District: Zaječar District
- Municipality: Sokobanja

Population (2002)
  - Total: 342
- Time zone: UTC+1 (CET)
  - Summer (DST): UTC+2 (CEST)

Trgovište is a village in the municipality of Sokobanja, Serbia. According to the 2002 census, the village has a population of 342 people.
