= Jezero, Sokobanja =

Jezero Језеро
- Village
- Location within Serbia
- Coordinates: 43°34′12″N 21°54′03″E
- Country: Serbia
- District: Zaječar District
- Municipality: Sokobanja
- Elevation: 680 m (2,230 ft)

Population (2011)
  - Total: 253
- Time zone: UTC+1 (CET)
  - Summer (DST): UTC+2 (CEST)
- Area code: (+381) 018
- Vehicle registration: ZA

Jezero is a village in the municipality of Sokobanja, Serbia. According to the 2002 census, the village has a population of 310 people.

Historical population
Year	1948	1953	1961	1971	1981	1991	2002	2011
Pop.	896	939	811	636	514	397	310	253
±%	—	+4.8%	−13.6%	−21.6%	−19.2%	−22.8%	−21.9%	−18.4%
