= Mužinac =

- Village
- Location within Serbia
- Coordinates: 43°42′22″N 21°51′06″E
- Country: Serbia
- District: Zaječar District
- Municipality: Sokobanja

Population (2002)
  - Total: 459
- Time zone: UTC+1 (CET)
  - Summer (DST): UTC+2 (CEST)

Mužinac is a village in the municipality of Sokobanja, Serbia. According to the 2002 census, the village has a population of 459 people.

The village was a site of operations in the First Serbian Uprising (1804–13). Ivan from Mužinac and Milojko from Blendija, known for their heroism, were appointed starešine (leaders) of Sokobanja in 1806 by vojvoda of Crna Reka Milisav Đorđević.

== Sources ==
- Jovanović, Dragoljub K. (1883). "Црна река". Glasnik Srpskog učenog društva. 54: 187–256.
- Nenadović, Konstantin N. (1884). Живот и дела великог Ђорђа Петровића Кара-Ђорђа. Vol. II (1 ed.). Vienna: У Штампарији Јована Н. Вернаја – via Google Books.
- Protić, Kosta (1893). "Ратни догађаји из првога српског устанка под Карађорђем Петровићем 1804—1813". Годишњица Николе Чупића. XIII. Državna štamparija.
