= Bukoviḱ (mountain) =

Mountain in North Macedonia

Coordinates: 41°41′N 20°54′E

Bukoviḱ (Macedonian: Буковиќ, Albanian: Bukoçi) is a small mountain situated in the south-east of the city of Gostivar, North Macedonia. The nearest settlements are Dolna Ǵonovica, Srbinovo, Simnica and Padalište.

It is located between the Polog Valley in the north, the Kichevo Valley in the south, the Bistra Mountain in the west and the Dobra Voda massif, i.e. Čeloica in the east. The mountain, which has a surface area of just 79 km2 (31 sq mi), is occasionally referred to as being a part of the Suva Gora massif.
