= Simnica =

Simnica Симница Simnicë
- Village
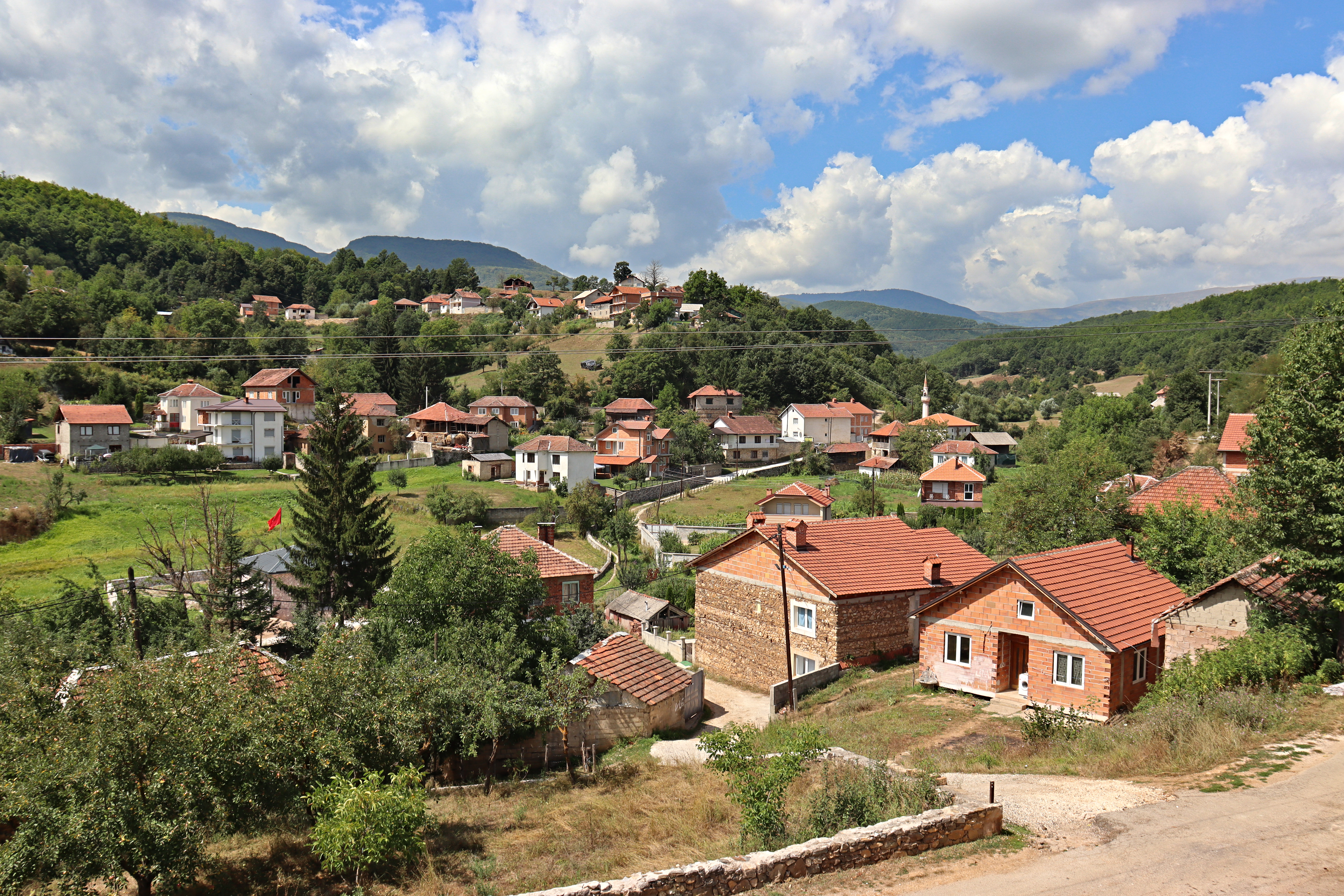
- View of the village

- Location within North Macedonia
- Coordinates: 41°43′N 20°53′E
- Country: North Macedonia
- Region: Polog
- Municipality: Gostivar

Population (2021)
  - Total: 183
- Time zone: UTC+1 (CET)
  - Summer (DST): UTC+2 (CEST)
- Car plates: GV
- Website: .

Simnica (Macedonian: Симница, Albanian: Simnicë) is a village in the municipality of Gostivar, North Macedonia.

== Demographics ==
As of the 2021 census, Simnica had 183 residents with the following ethnic composition:

- Albanians 159
- Persons for whom data are taken from administrative sources 24

According to the 2002 census, the village had a total of 430 inhabitants. Ethnic groups in the village include:

- Albanians 424
- Others 6
