= Dolna Ǵonovica =

Dolna Ǵonovica Долна Ѓоновица Gjonovicë e Poshtme
- Village
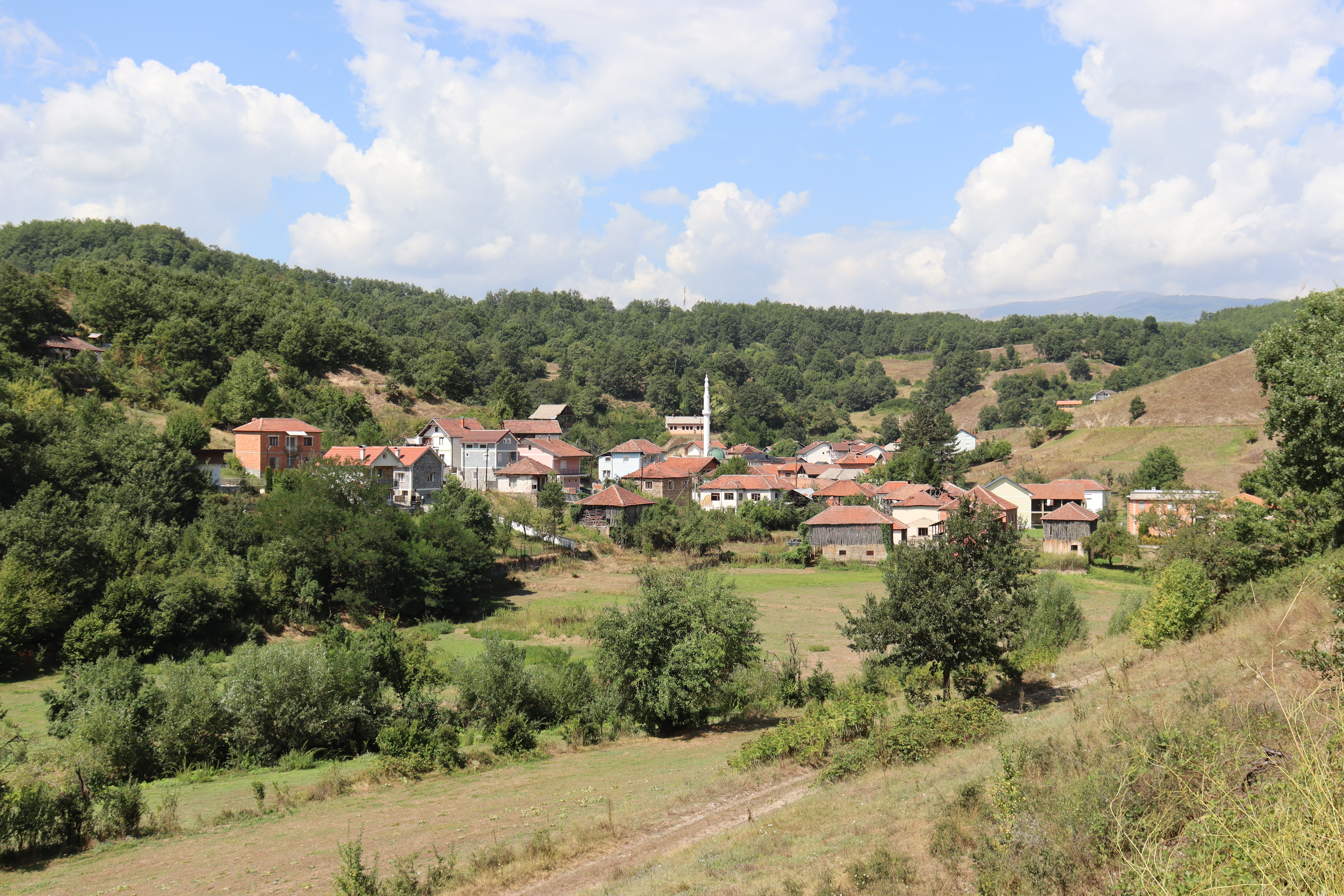
- View of the village

- Location within North Macedonia
- Coordinates: 41°43′N 20°54′E
- Country: North Macedonia
- Region: Polog
- Municipality: Gostivar

Population (2021)
  - Total: 35
- Time zone: UTC+1 (CET)
  - Summer (DST): UTC+2 (CEST)
- Car plates: GV
- Website: .

Dolna Ǵonovica (Macedonian: Долна Ѓоновица, Albanian: Gjonovicë e Poshtme) is a village in the municipality of Gostivar, North Macedonia.

== Name ==
The name stems from the Albanian name Gjon plus the Slavic suffix ov/ica.

== Demographics ==
As of the 2021 census, Dolna Ǵonovica had 35 residents with the following ethnic composition:

- Albanians 22
- Persons for whom data are taken from administrative sources 8
- Macedonians 5

According to the 2002 census, the village had a total of 242 inhabitants. Ethnic groups in the village include:

- Albanians 239
- Others 3

According to the 1942 Albanian census, Dolna Ǵonovica was inhabited by 274 Muslim Albanians.
