= Šarbanovac (Bor) =

Šarbanovac Шарбановац
- Village
- Location within Serbia
- Coordinates: 43°57′42″N 22°05′02″E
- Country: Serbia
- District: Bor District
- Municipality: Bor

Population (2022)
  - Total: 1,311
- Time zone: UTC+1 (CET)
  - Summer (DST): UTC+2 (CEST)

Šarbanovac (Serbian Cyrillic: Шарбановац) is a village in the municipality of Bor, Serbia. According to the 2022 census, it has a population of 1,311 people.
