= Srbinovo =

Srbinovo Србиново Sërmnovë
- Village
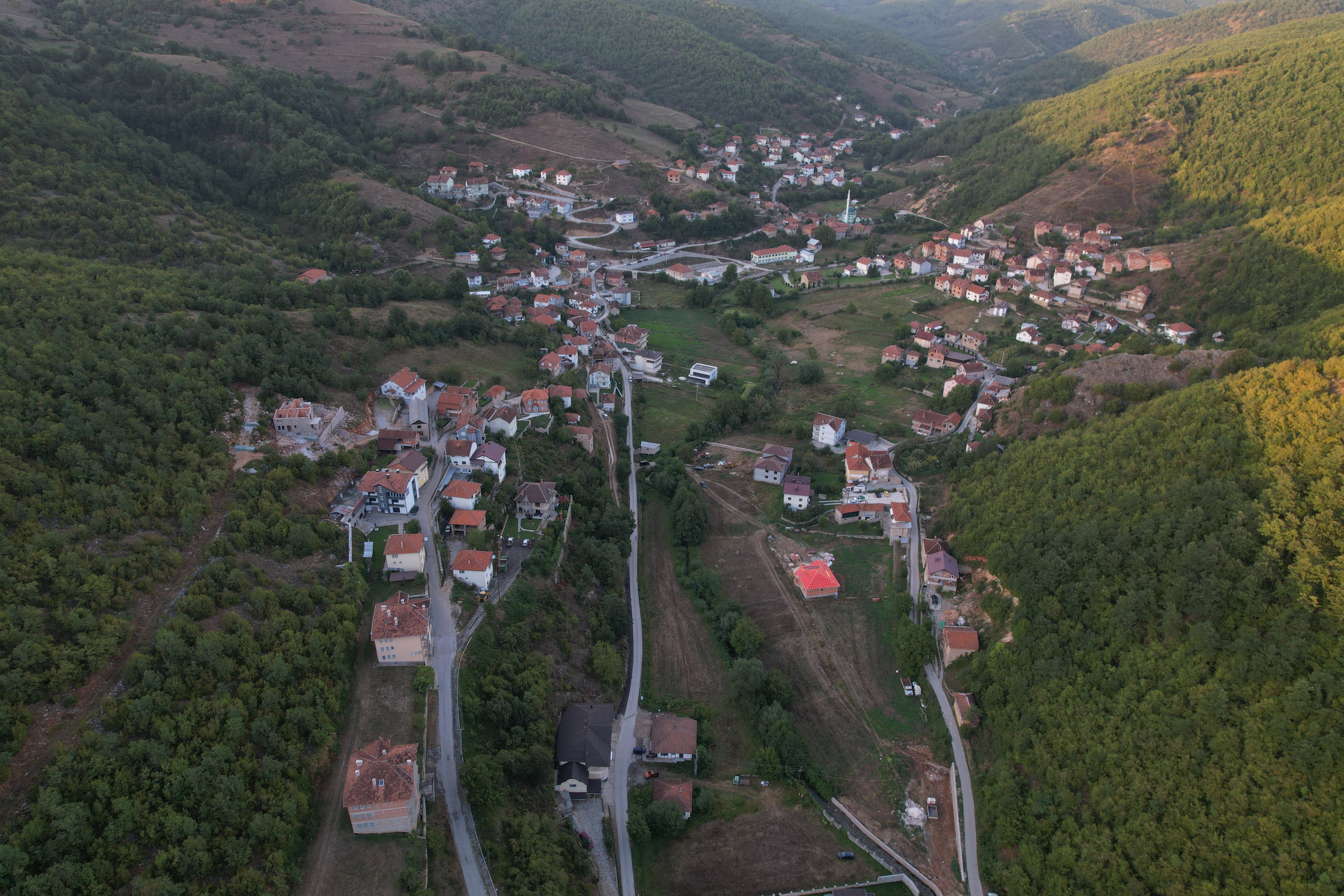
- Airview of the village

- Location within North Macedonia
- Coordinates: 41°42′N 20°58′E
- Country: North Macedonia
- Region: Polog
- Municipality: Gostivar

Population (2021)
  - Total: 317
- Time zone: UTC+1 (CET)
  - Summer (DST): UTC+2 (CEST)
- Car plates: GV
- Website: .

Srbinovo (Macedonian: Србиново; Albanian: Sërmnovë) is a village in the municipality of Gostivar, North Macedonia. Its FIPS code was MK94.

== Demographics ==
Srbinovo is attested in the 1467/68 Ottoman tax registry (defter) for the Nahiyah of Kalkandelen. The village had a total of 9 Christian households and 1 widow.

As of the 2021 census, Srbinovo had 317 residents with the following ethnic composition:

- Albanians 270
- Persons for whom data are taken from administrative sources 47

According to the 2002 census, the village had a total of 1,179 inhabitants. Ethnic groups in the village include:

- Albanians 1,179

According to the 1942 Albanian census, Srbinovo was inhabited by 788 Muslim Albanians.
