= Devica =

Mountain in Serbia

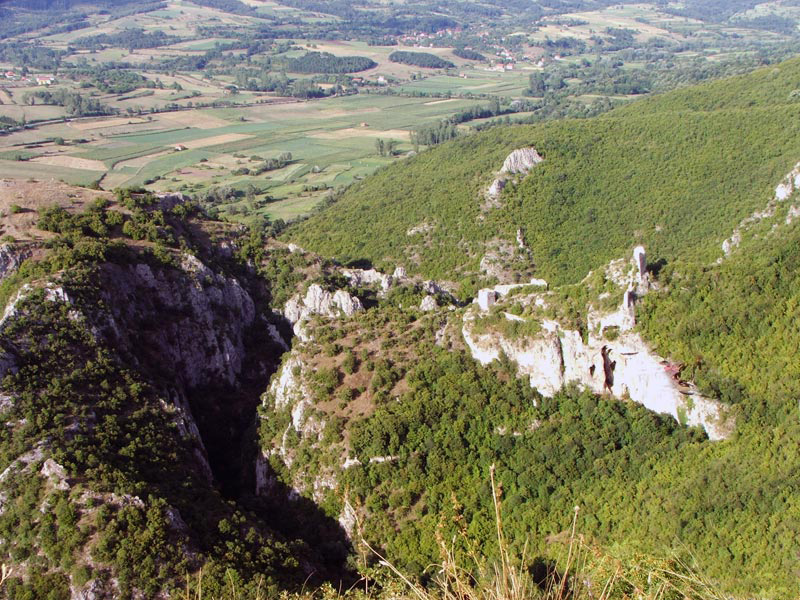
- Ruins of Soko Grad

Highest point
- Elevation: 1,187 m (3,894 ft)
- Coordinates: 43°35′38″N 21°56′39″E

Geography
- Location within Serbia
- Location: Eastern Serbia
- Parent range: Carpathian Mountains, Balkan Mountains

Devica (Serbian Cyrillic: Девица) is a mountain in eastern Serbia, near the town of Sokobanja. Its highest peak, Čapljinac (also called Manjin Kamen) has an elevation of 1,187 m (3,894 ft) above sea level. It belongs to the boundary of Carpathian and Balkan mountain ranges, which meet in eastern Serbia.

It is bounded by the spa town on Sokobanja and river Moravica on north, Labukovo on south, road Sokobanja-Labukovo on west, and Galibabinac on east. The deep canyon of Moravica is cut into Devica's northern edge, dominated by the old fortress Soko Grad. At the height of around 1100 m there is a large plateau, with several caves and other carst formations. Except for parts near Sokobanja, it has no tourist facilities and is relatively unknown to the wider public.

== See also ==
- List of mountains in Serbia
