= Bukoviḱ =

Bukoviḱ Буковиќ Bukoviq
- Village
- Location within North Macedonia
- Coordinates: 41°58′25″N 21°14′20″E
- Country: North Macedonia
- Region: Skopje
- Municipality: Saraj

Population (2021)
  - Total: 1,842
- Time zone: UTC+1 (CET)
  - Summer (DST): UTC+2 (CEST)
- Postal code: 1063
- Car plates: SK
- Website: .

Bukoviḱ (Macedonian: Буковиќ, Albanian: Bukoviq) is a village in the municipality of Saraj, North Macedonia.

== Demographics ==
According to the 2021 census, the village had a total of 1.842 inhabitants. Ethnic groups in the village include:

- Albanians 1.769
- Others 73

Year	Macedonian	Albanian	Turks	Romani	Vlachs	Serbs	Bosniaks	Others	Total
2002	1	1.721	...	...	...	...	...	1	1.723
2021	...	1.769	...	...	...	...	...	73	1.842
