= Rtanj =

Mountain in Serbia

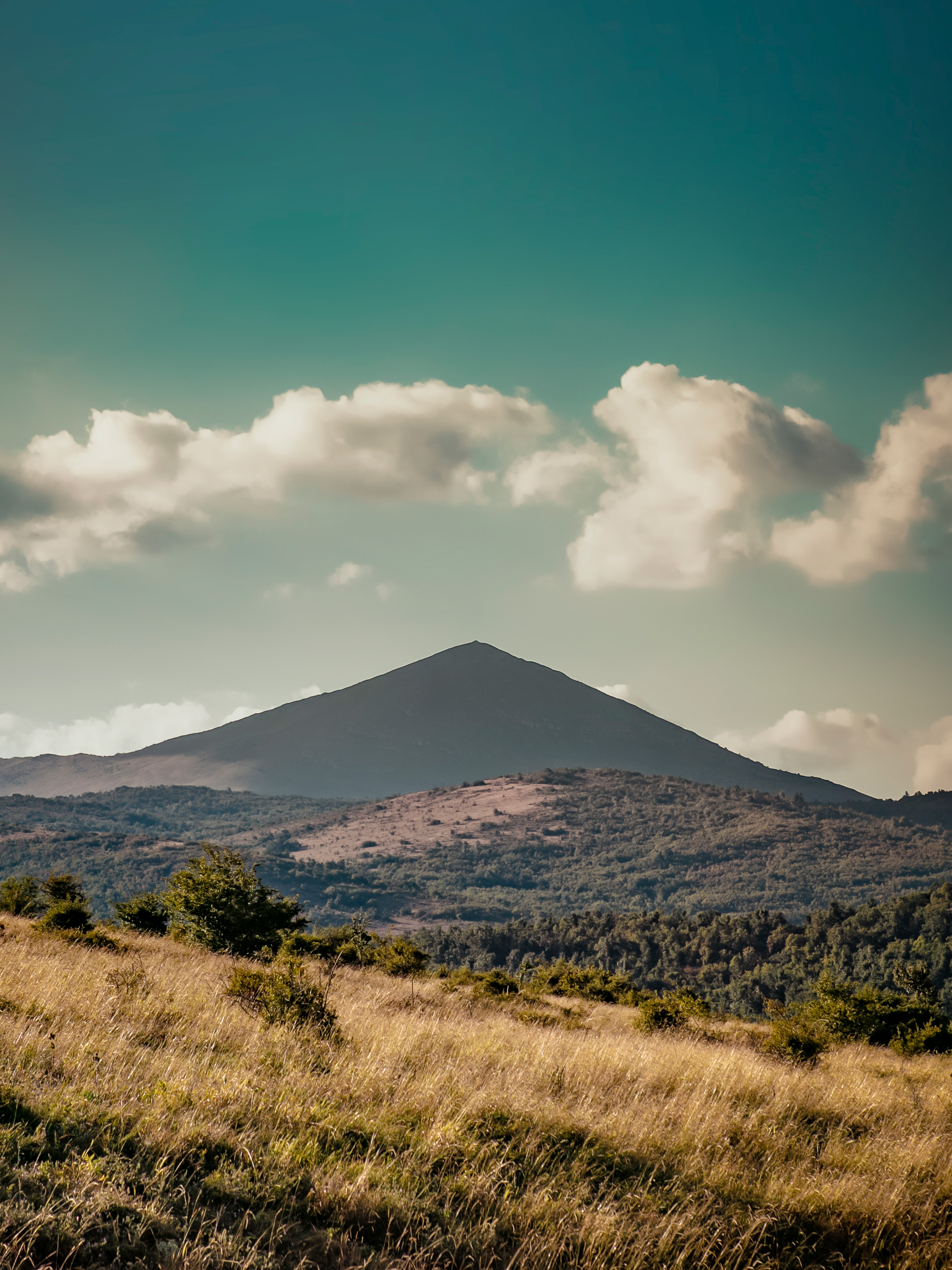

Highest point
- Elevation: 1,565 m (5,135 ft)
- Prominence: 1,039 m (3,409 ft)
- Listing: Ribu
- Coordinates: 43°46′34″N 21°53′36″E

Geography
- Location within Serbia
- Location: Eastern Serbia
- Parent range: Carpathian Mountains

Rtanj (Serbian: Ртањ pronounced [r̩̂ːtaɲ]; Romanian: Râtani) is a mountain situated in eastern Serbia, between the towns of Boljevac on north and Sokobanja on the south. Its highest peak is Šiljak (pronounced [ʃǐːʎak]) (1,565 m), a natural phenomenon of karst terrain.

The north side of the mountain is covered with forests and shrubs, full of autochthonous plant species and plenty of sources of potable water. A hunting ground covers 6368 ha. The most common prey are roe deer and wild boar.

== Geography ==
Rtanj is located in eastern Serbia, occupying the southwestern, Balkans section of the Carpathian Mountains. Administratively, it belongs to the municipalities of Sokobanja and Boljevac. The most obvious physical feature is its conical shape on top of the mountain ridge, which appears to be perfect. The highest peak is the 1,565 m (5,135 ft) tall Šiljak.

== History ==
Entrepreneur Julijus Minh founded a mine on the mountain in the 19th century. His widow, Greta Minh, built a mausoleum in the form of a little chapel dedicated to her husband on the Šiljak peak. The chapel was built in 1932 and was dedicated to St. George. Some 1,000 miners participated in its construction as Minh, in the process of developing the mine, built apartments, a school, community health center, a cinema, and a park.

After World War II, the new Communist authorities demolished the chapel's dome with the cross in 1946. In an effort to find the gold and jewels which according to Serbian folk mythology were hidden inside the mountain, the treasure hunters damaged the chapel using dynamite on several occasions since the 1980s, demolishing the remaining walls in the process.

The first open-air bio pool in Serbia was built on Rtanj in 2019. It is filled with the mineral-rich water from the natural spring, discovered in 14th century, and needs no pumps. The water is chlorine-free; instead, plants and algae which naturally filter and clean the water are planted in one section of the pool. From this mini-lake, filtered water flows over several small steps into the pool. The shape of the pool is inspired by the Serbian ramonda flower, while the nearby hotel is shaped like a pyramid, mimicking the shape of the mountain itself.

== Mythology ==
=== Folklore ===
According to folk legend, the castle of a wizard was situated on Rtanj Mountain, in which a great treasure was guarded. However, the castle has disappeared within the mountain, trapping the wealthy sorcerer inside. Ever since, treasure hunters have been visiting the mountain seeking the lost gold and gems.

=== Fringe theories ===
In 1971, poet Miodrag Pavlović wrote a poem, "Splendid Wonder" (Divno čudo). Inspired by local folk myths, Pavlović described Rtanj as an abode of the ancient Serbian gods. In the next decades, additionally influenced by the pyramidal shape of the mountain, Rtanj became popular among fringe theories supporters. In the 21st century it became a place of regular gathering of believers in paranormal, who organize groups, symposiums, and "surveys" of the mountain.

The most popular theory is that, due to its shape and other "observed" factors (precise pyramidal geometry, golden ratio math, wondrous natural life, strong electromagnetism with fine frequencies, endemic plants, healthy energy radiation, special climate, mystical cultural heritage, naturally radiation-ionized air, Tesla waves), the mountain had to have been artificially built. Claims are made that it is a multi-dimensional portal, that a channel leads from the top of the mountain to below the ground being used as a launch pad for alien spaceships, and that Rtanj is an "oscillator and resonator of the subtle energy hubs". Alleged sightings of the "flying balls" over the mountain became a common place.

For some New Age believers, the pyramidal shape of the mountain is due to its containing an alien pyramid emitting mystical energies. Many people have flocked here prior to the predicted 2012 Mayan Doomsday, believing that it would protect them, as Rtanj is the "strongest energy spot on the planet". Alleging that the name of the mountain came from the Latin word artan, which in turn derives from art in artificius ("artificial", human-made), the theory of Artania, an ancient pre-civilization highly technologically advanced and spiritually locale developed. There are also claims of a Roman hospital in the foothills, where wounded soldiers from all over the empire were brought, as they would heal three times faster.

Vrelo locality is described as the source of magnetic energy, the results of which are "confirmed" by radiesthesia surveys, as attested to by the plaque on the small stone pyramid. People stand in the hole in this area, filling themselves with energy. They claim that prehistoric people recuperated their energy on this spot, that animals sleep on this spot during winter, and that strange images that allegedly show up on photos taken here are due to time travelers.

== Plantlife ==
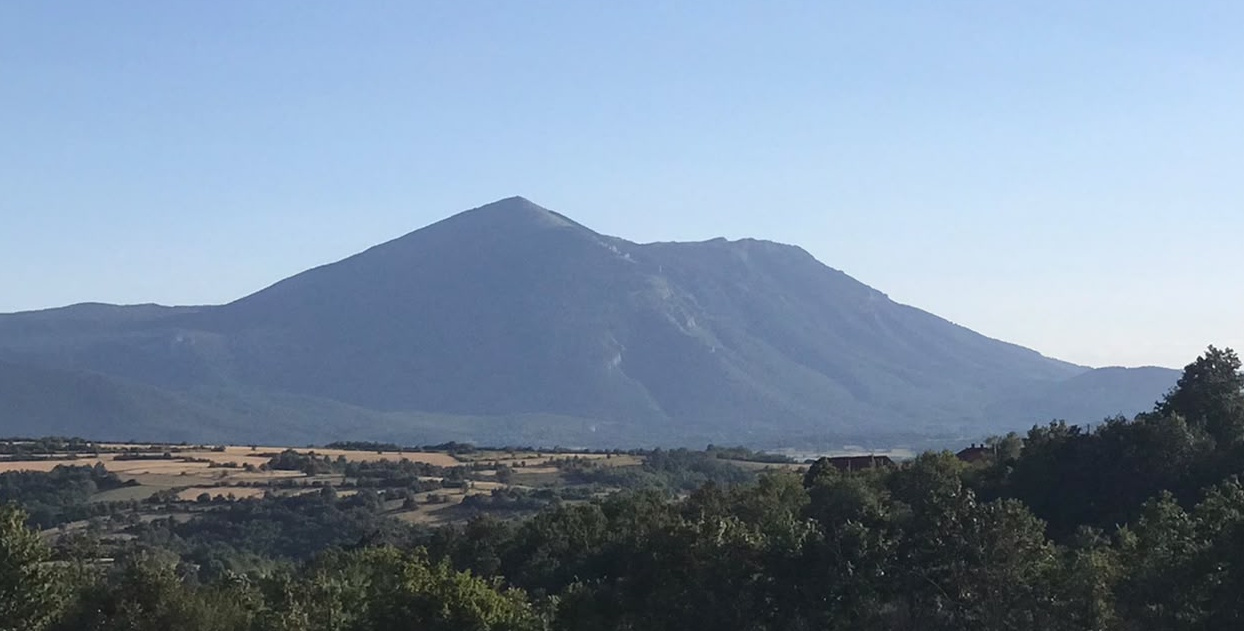
View from northern side

The mountain is home to Rtanj catmint (Nepeta rtanjensis), endemic species of the Nepeta genus. Discovered in 1974, it grows only on the Rtanj. In 2020, a postage stamp with the image of the plant was issued, celebrating the 125th anniversary of the Natural History Museum.

A widely known traditional product of Rtanj is Rtanj tea, an herbal infusion made of winter savory, celebrated for its antiseptic and aromatic properties, and allegedly an aphrodisiac, which gave the plant a local moniker đipikur ("jump(ing)-dick"). Allegedly, the plant also has bronchodilatory and antioxidant effect, and the imbiber's virility is enhanced because of the flavonoids which stimulate testosterone production. Before it gained its modern reputation, it has been used by the local population as a remedy for bronchitis, asthma, coughing, children's respiratory inflammations, and gerontology problems.

By 2019, the massive summer harvesting of winter savory on Rtanj was banned by the Institute for Nature Conservation of Serbia until the species recovers. The plant has been over-harvested in general, but was especially damaged as, instead of the former harvesting using knives or scissors, harvesters began massively pulling out the plants from their roots.

Medicinal and aromatic wildly grown herbs picked on the Rtanj and the mountain Ozren, which is on the opposite, southern side of Sokobanja, account for the majority of Serbian exports of these commodities, which in 2018 reached €3.3 million.

== Protection ==
Rtanj was placed under protection in 2019 when it was declared a special nature reserve Rtanj.

== See also ==
- List of mountains in Serbia
