= Balinačka river =

Balinačka River
- Native name: Балиначка река (Serbian)

Location
- Country: Serbia

Physical characteristics
- Mouth
  - location: Žukovačka River
  - coordinates: 43°31′48″N 22°18′05″E
- Length: 12.0 km (7.5 mi)
- Basin size: 21 km^{2} (8.1 sq mi)

Basin features
- Progression: Žukovačka→ Trgoviški Timok→ Beli Timok→ Timok→ Danube→ Black Sea

The Balinačka River (Serbian: Балиначка река / Balinačka reka, "Balinac River") is a tributary of the Žukovačka River in Serbia. The village Balinac lies at the source of the river. It continues through Staro Korito and Kandalica and joins the Žukovačka River in Žukovac. Its total length is 12.0 km (7.5 mi), and its drainage basin area is 21 km^{2} (8.1 sq mi).
