= Timok (disambiguation) =

Timok (Cyrillic: Тимок, Romanian: Timoc) is a river in eastern Serbia and western Bulgaria.

Timok may also refer to:

- Timok Valley, a region in Serbia around the river
- FK Timok Zaječar, Serbian football club

Tributaries of Timok river:

- Beli Timok
- Trgoviški Timok
- Svrljiški Timok
- Crni Timok
