= Beli Timok =

Beli Timok Knjaževački Timok
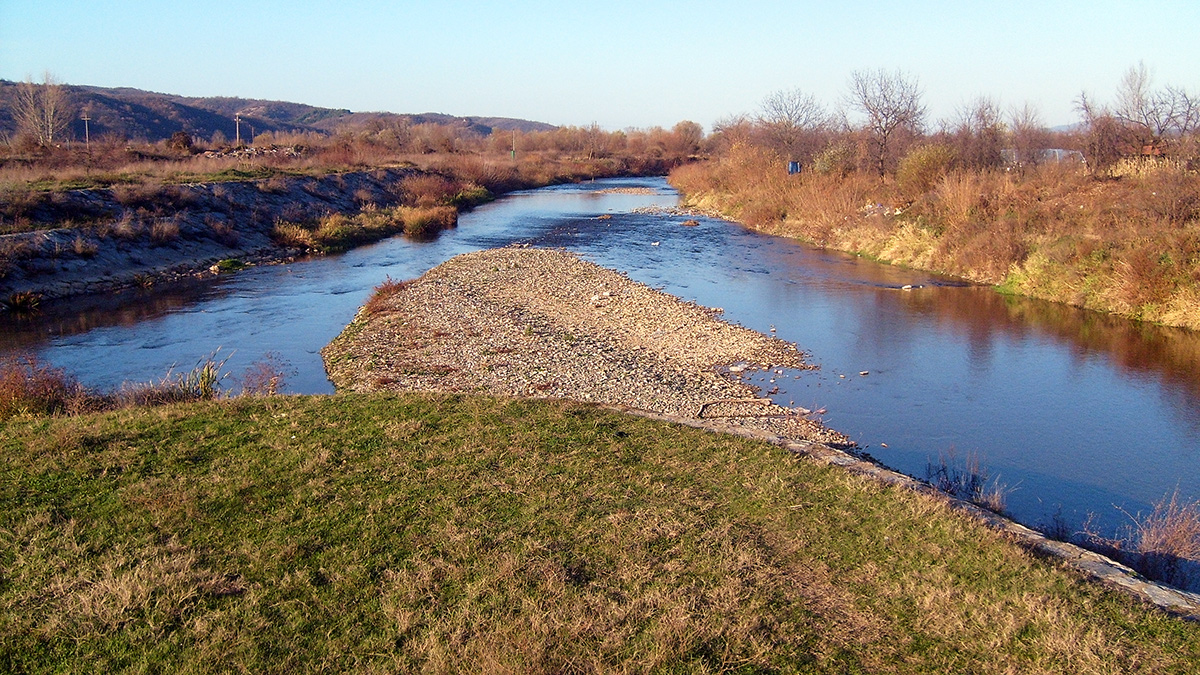
- Native name: Бели Тимок (Serbian)

Location
- Country: Serbia
- City: Knjaževac, Zaječar

Physical characteristics
- Source: Knjaževac
  - location: Junction of the Svrljiški Timok and the Trgoviški Timok
- Mouth: Timok
  - location: Zaječar
  - coordinates: 43°55′12″N 22°17′52″E
- Length: 50 km (31 mi)
- Basin size: 2,155 km^{2} (832 sq mi)

Basin features
- Progression: Timok→ Danube→ Black Sea

The Beli Timok (Serbian Cyrillic: Бели Тимок, "White Timok") is a headwater of the Timok River in Serbia. It starts at the junction of the Svrljiški Timok River and the Trgoviški Timok River, in Knjaževac. It was also known as Knjaževački Timok (Књажевачки Тимок, "Timok of Knjaževac").

The river continues to the north, almost in a straight line, parallel to the Serbian-Bulgarian border on the east, and the eastern slopes of the mountain Tupižnica, on the west. It is generally considered that from this point, the Timok Valley region begins. The river passes through Gornje Zuniče, Donje Zuniče, Debelica, Trnovac, Minićevo, Drenovac, Selačka, Mali Izvor, Borovac, Vratarnica, and Grljan. On this area, the Beli Timok receives two left tributaries, the Grliška reka (Грлишка река) and the Lubnička reka (Лубничка река). A few kilometers after Grljan, the river reaches the largest city on its course, Zaječar. There, the Beli Timok meets the Crni Timok from the east and continues as the Veliki Timok. The length of the Beli Timok is 50 km (115 km with Svrljiški Timok) and it drains an area of 2,155 km^{2}.

== Tributaries ==
The tributaries of the Beli Timok are:

Left: Grazinska, Valevačka, Debelicka, Koželjska, Vrbica, Zagradža Grliška, Lubnička

Right: Sinia Voda, Jelašnica, Koritska, Selačka, Balij, Šaška River, Buckov
