= Žukovačka River =

- Native name: Жуковачка река (Serbian)

Location
- Country: Serbia

Physical characteristics
- Mouth
  - location: Trgoviški Timok
  - coordinates: 43°31′30″N 22°17′17″E
- Length: 21.3 km (13.2 mi)
- Basin size: 104 km^{2} (40 sq mi)

Basin features
- Progression: Trgoviški Timok→ Beli Timok→ Timok→ Danube→ Black Sea
- Tributaries
  - left: Pričevska
  - right: Dejanovačka, Balinačka

The Žukovačka River (Serbian: Жуковачка река / Žukovačka reka, "Žukovac River") is the largest right tributary of the Trgoviški Timok in Serbia. In its upper course it is also called Leva River (Лева река / Leva reka, "Left River") and Aldinačka River (Алдиначка река / Aldinačka reka). It flows into the Trgoviški Timok near Žukovac. Its total length is 21.3 km (13.2 mi), and its drainage basin area is 104 km^{2} (40 sq mi).
