= Vârf =

Vârf (Romanian for "peak, summit, top", from Slavic vrh, vrah) may refer to:

- Vârf, a village in Năeni Commune, Buzău County, Romania
- Vârfurile, Arad, a commune in Romania
- Vârf, the Romanian name of Vrav, a village in Bulgaria
