= Trgoviški Timok =

Trgoviški Timok Korenatac, Strma River
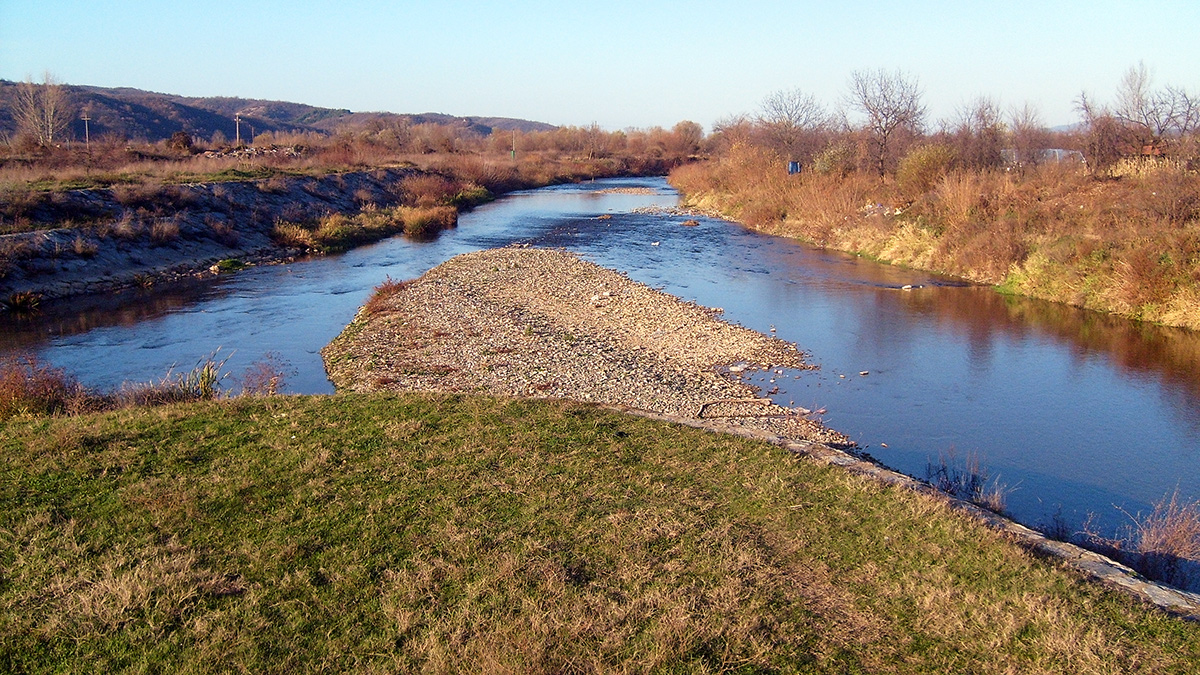
- Native name: Трговишки Тимок (Serbian)

Location
- Country: Serbia
- City: Kalna, Knjaževac

Physical characteristics
- Mouth: Beli Timok
  - location: Knjaževac
  - coordinates: 43°34′31″N 22°15′33″E
- Length: 54.1 km (33.6 mi)
- Basin size: 537 km^{2} (207 sq mi)

Basin features
- Progression: Beli Timok→ Timok→ Danube→ Black Sea

The Trgoviški Timok (Serbian Cyrillic: Трговишки Тимок, "Timok of Trgovište") is a river in Serbia, also known as Korenatac (Serbian Cyrillic: Коренатац) or Strma River (Serbian: Стрма река / Strma reka, "Steep River"). It starts on the western slopes of the Balkan Mountains (Stara Planina), right under the highest peak of the mountain in Serbia, Midžor, less than a kilometer from the Bulgarian border. The river runs to the east, receiving three smaller streams from the other peaks of Balkan mountain range with colorful names (Babin Zub and Tri Uši; Serbian Cyrillic: Бабин Зуб and Три Уши, "Oldwife's Tooth" and "Three Ears"). The river passes through the villages of Balta Berilovac, Vrtovac and Inovo. On this reach it receives the Debelička and Ćuštička rivers from the left and the Golaška and Inovska rivers from the right. At the village of Kalna, it is joined by the Stanjanska River, flowing down the northern slopes of the Jadovnik mountain, turns to the north and becomes known as the Trgoviški Timok.

The Trgoviški Timok flows to the north-west, through Gornja Kamenica, Donja Kamenica, Štrbac, and Trgovište, a suburb of Knjaževac and one of the rare settlements in eastern Serbia that experiences population growth. It also gave the name to the river. On this reach it receives the Deščanska River from the left and the Papratska, Brezova, Žukovska and Štitarska rivers from the right.

The Trgoviški Timok is 54 km long. Running on the left slopes of the Tresibaba mountain, the river reaches Knjaževac, where it is joined by the Svrljiški Timok from the south-west, forming together the Beli Timok. It drains an area of 537 km^{2}.

== Tributaries ==
The tributaries of the Trgoviški Timok are:

Left: Debelička, Ćuštička, Stanjanska River, Deščanska

Right: Golaška, Inovska, Papratska, Brezova, Žukovačka, Štitarska
