= Kudelin =

Kudelin Куделин
- Village
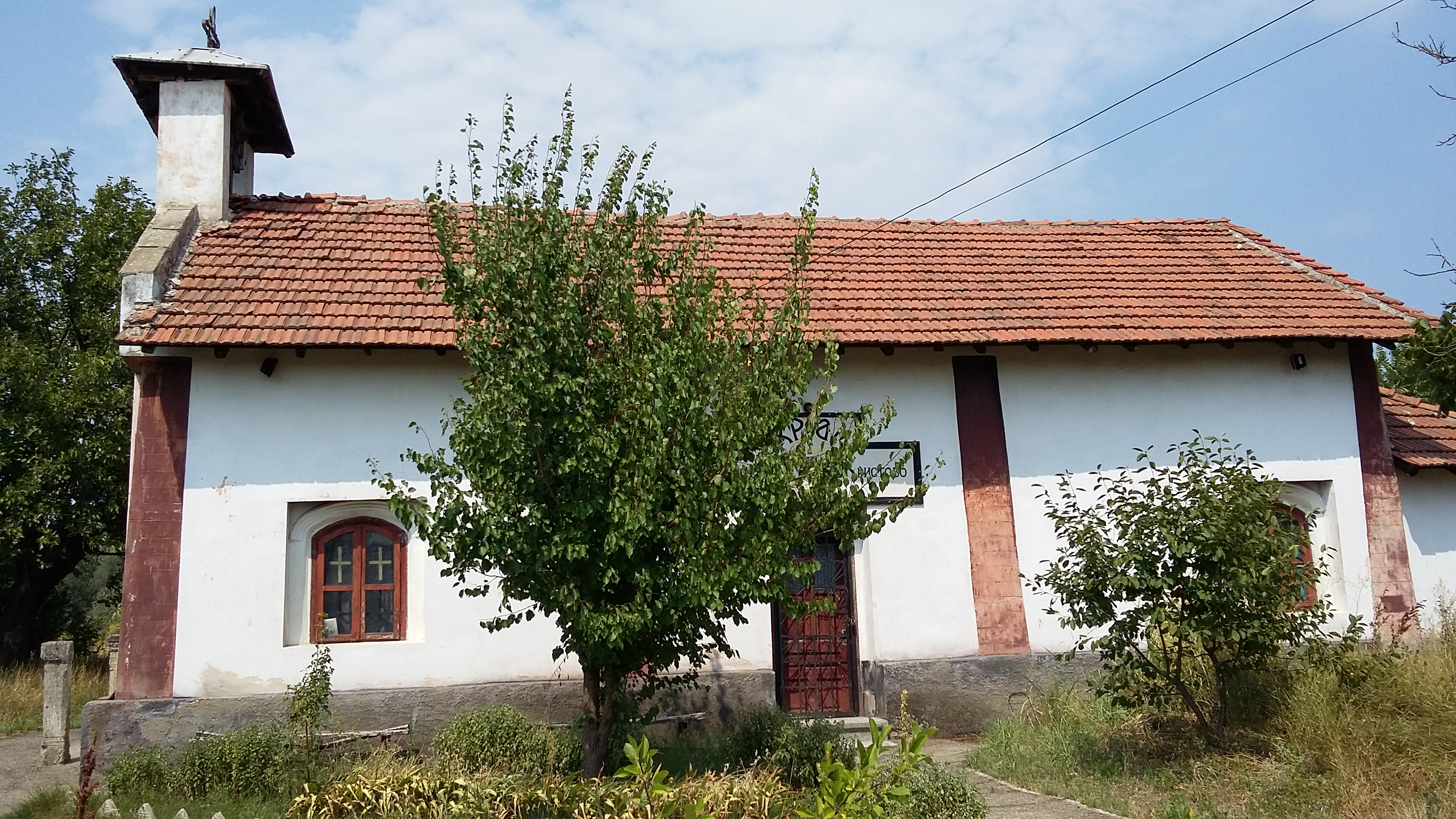

- Location of Kudelin within Bulgaria
- Coordinates: 44.191667°N 22.668056°E
- Country: Bulgaria
- Province: Vidin
- Municipality: Bregovo

Area
  - Total: 7.556 km^{2} (2.917 sq mi)
- Elevation: 199 m (653 ft)

Population
  - Total: 430
- Postcode: 3798
- Telephone code: 09312

Kudelin (Bulgarian: Куделин) is a village in the Bregovo Municipality of the Vidin Province of Bulgaria.

== Geography ==
Kudelin lies mostly on a plain lying around 200 m (660 ft) above sea level, the square in front of the town hall being the highest terrestrial point. It is about 1.5 to 2 km (1,600 to 2,200 yd) east of the River Timok, which forms the border with Serbia from its mouth at the confluence with the River Danube to the north to the border with Romania to the southeast.

== Demography ==
In 1934, the population of Kudelin was 433. By 1975 it reached its maximum of 586, decreasing to 405 people by 2001, and 317 by 2018.

At the 2011 census, the population was 385, of which 96.1% were ethnically Bulgarian.

Local people earn their living mainly from cereal farming. The Danube and Timok rivers are used for recreation and fishing.

== History ==
Historically, the village was called "Wallachian Rakovica" (Bulgarian: Влашка Раковица). In 1934 it was renamed after Kudelin, a joint ruler of Braničevo at the end of the 13th century.

At the outbreak of First Balkan War in 1912, a local man enlisted in the Macedonian-Adrianopolitan Volunteer Corps.

The first lighthouse on Bulgaria's shore of the Danube was built in Kudelin.
