= Monastery of the Holy Trinity, Gornja Kamenica =

Orthodox Monastery

Monastery of the Holy Trinity in Gornja Kamenica Манастир Свете Тројице у Горњој Каменици
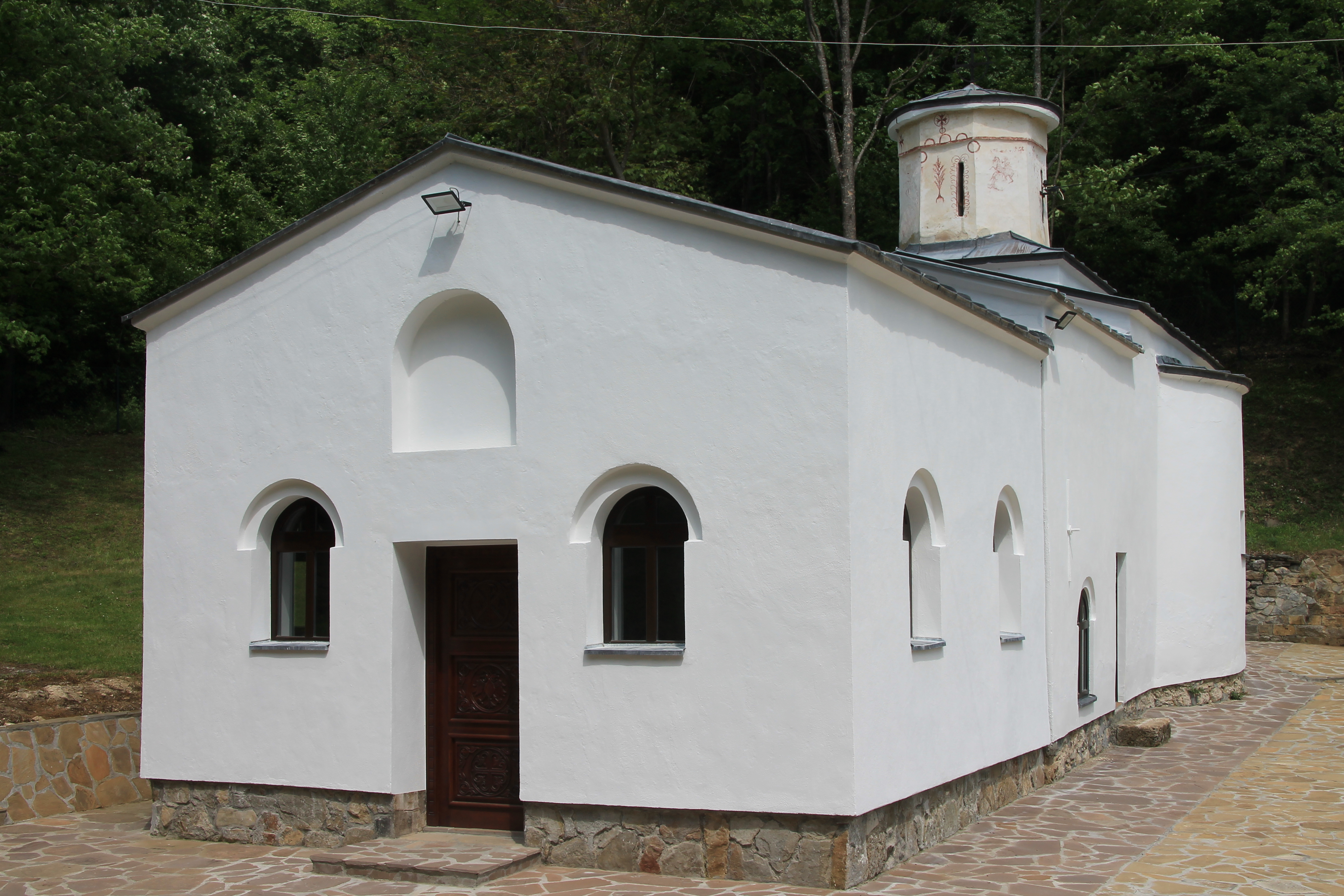
- Interactive map of Monastery of the Holy Trinity in Gornja Kamenica; Манастир Свете Тројице у Горњој Каменици

Monastery information
- Full name: Манастир - Свете Тројице у Горњој Каменици
- Order: Serbian Orthodox
- Established: 1457
- Dedication: Holy Trinity

People
- Founder: Lazar Branković

Site
- Location: Gornja Kamenica
- Coordinates: 43.4823°N 22.3405°E
- Public access: Yes

Monastery of the Holy Trinity in Gornja Kamenica is located on the slopes of the Balkan Mountains, 15 kilometers (9.3 mi) southeast of Knjaževac, Serbia, between Donja and Gornja Kamenica, on the right bank of the Trgoviški Timok. It belongs to the Eparchy of Timok of Serbian Orthodox Church.

== History ==
The monastery was burnt and destroyed in the past, and it leaves no important documents about its origin. The only inscription that mentions the founder was renovated in 1848 by the first known abbot of the Holy Trinity, Hieromonk Pantelejmon (Nedeljković). Judging by the inscription in the nave of the temple, it is assumed that the temple was built by the son of Đurađ Branković, despot Lazar Branković in 1457.

== Architecture ==
According to its architectural design, the church has long been considered to belong to the Morava architectural school, given that its form of a concise triconchos with a dome pointed to it, but the modest rustic masonry and the characteristic set of choir stalls with a domed part indicate that the church was built at the beginning of the 17th century. Fragments of paintings have been preserved in the dome and altar area, as well as on the original western facade of the church. The narthex was added only after the painting, vaulted with a semi-calotate, which is supported on a pair of trompies on the west side. The remains of the frescoes in the chancel today are reduced to areas of plinths and standing figures and certainly belong to the art of the middle of the 17th century.

Thanks to conservation works on architecture in 1950, 1968 and 1970–1971, the later exonarthex was removed, which restored the shape it had in the mid-17th century.

== Gallery ==
Monastery of the Holy Trinity in Gornja Kamenica

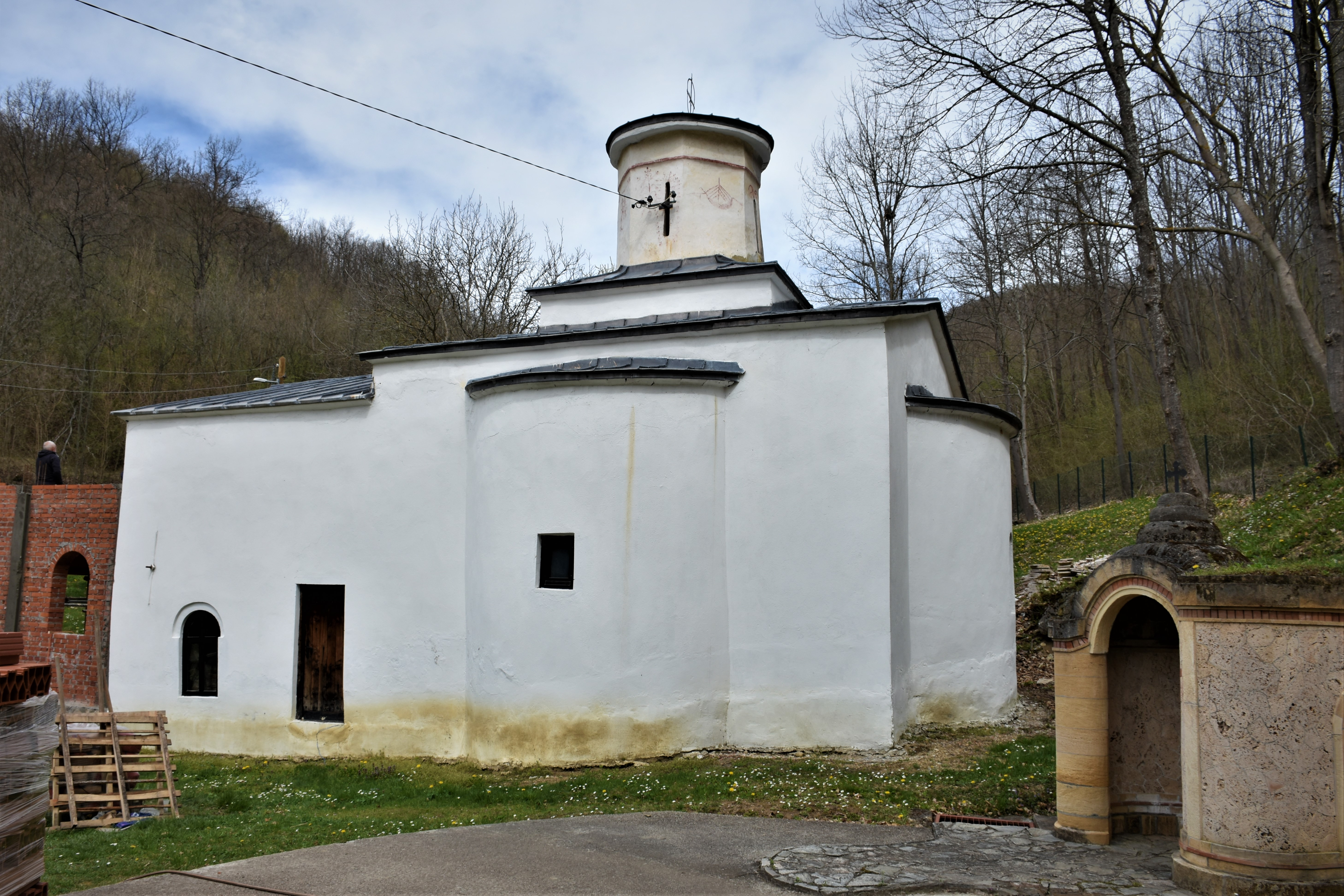
Works on the extension of the monastery in 2022.

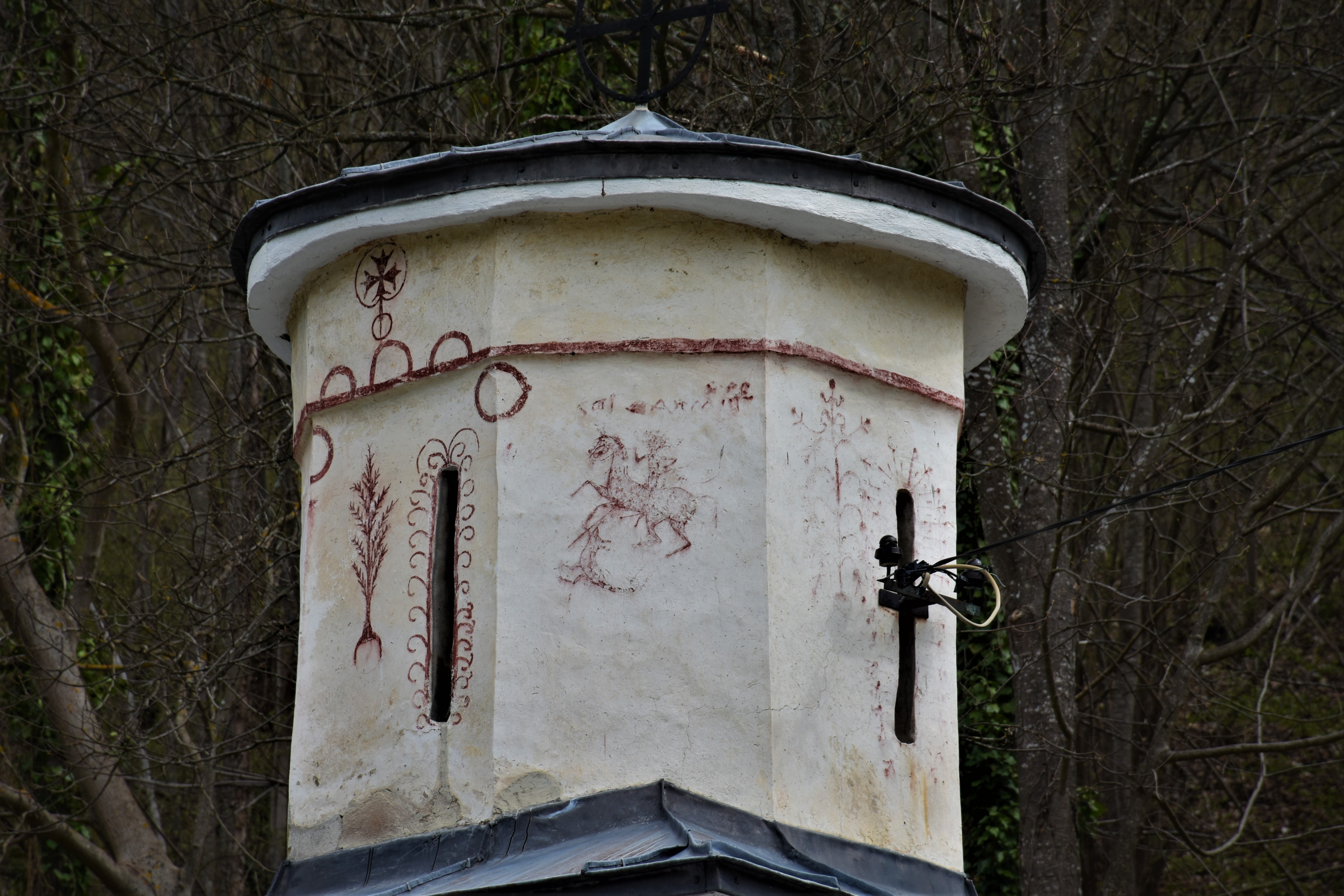
Preserved drawings in the Monastery.

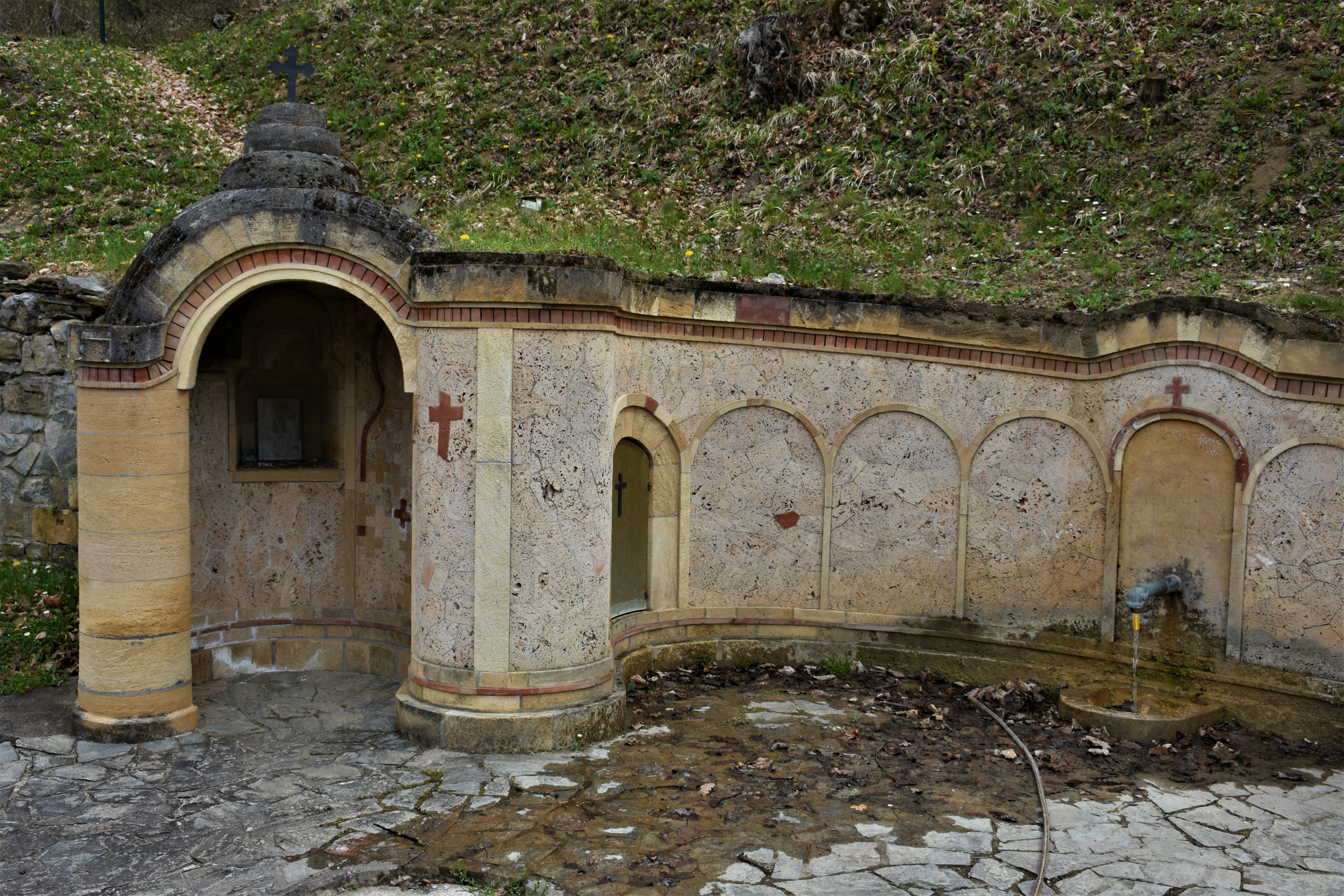
The fountain in the port of the Monastery

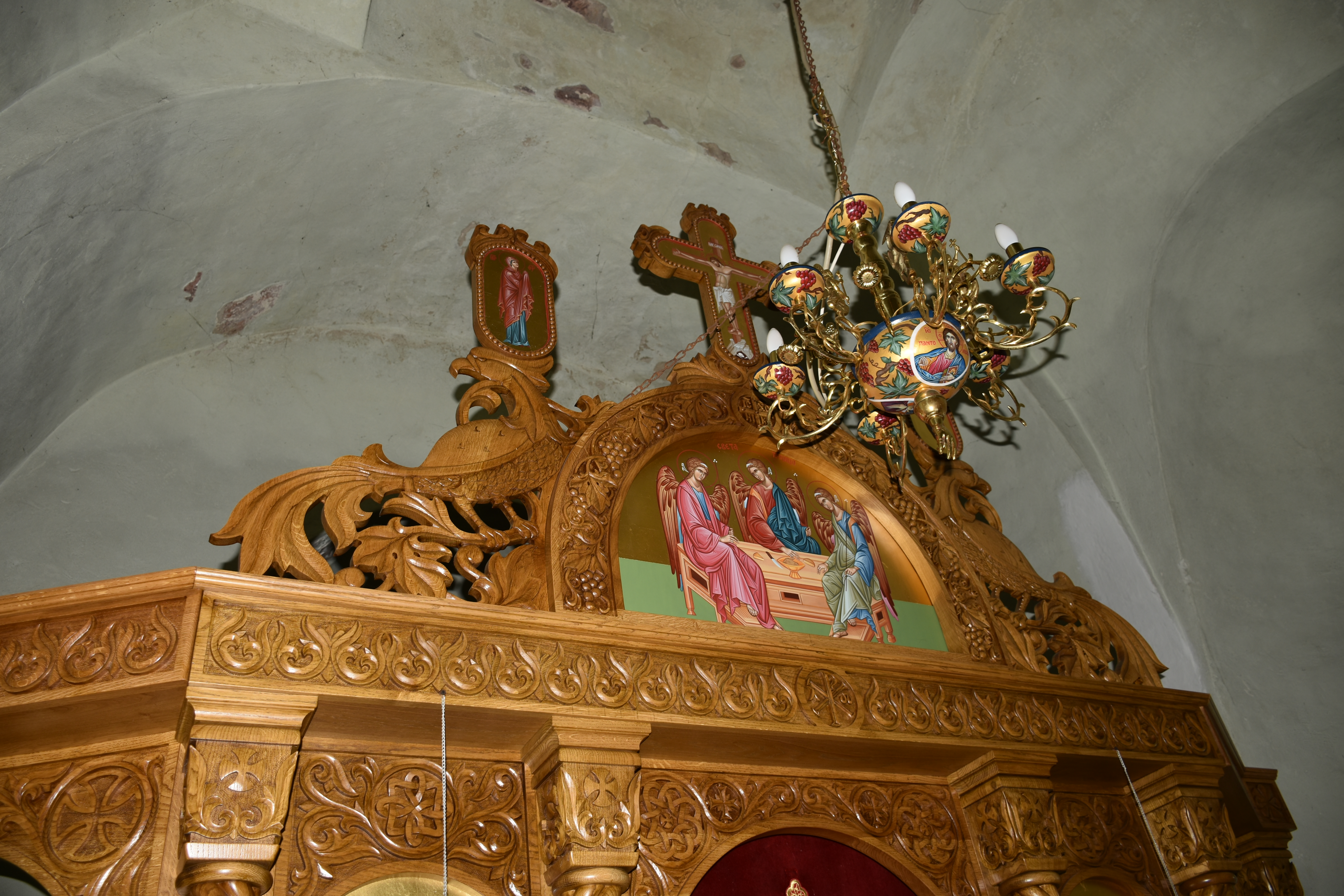
Interior detail

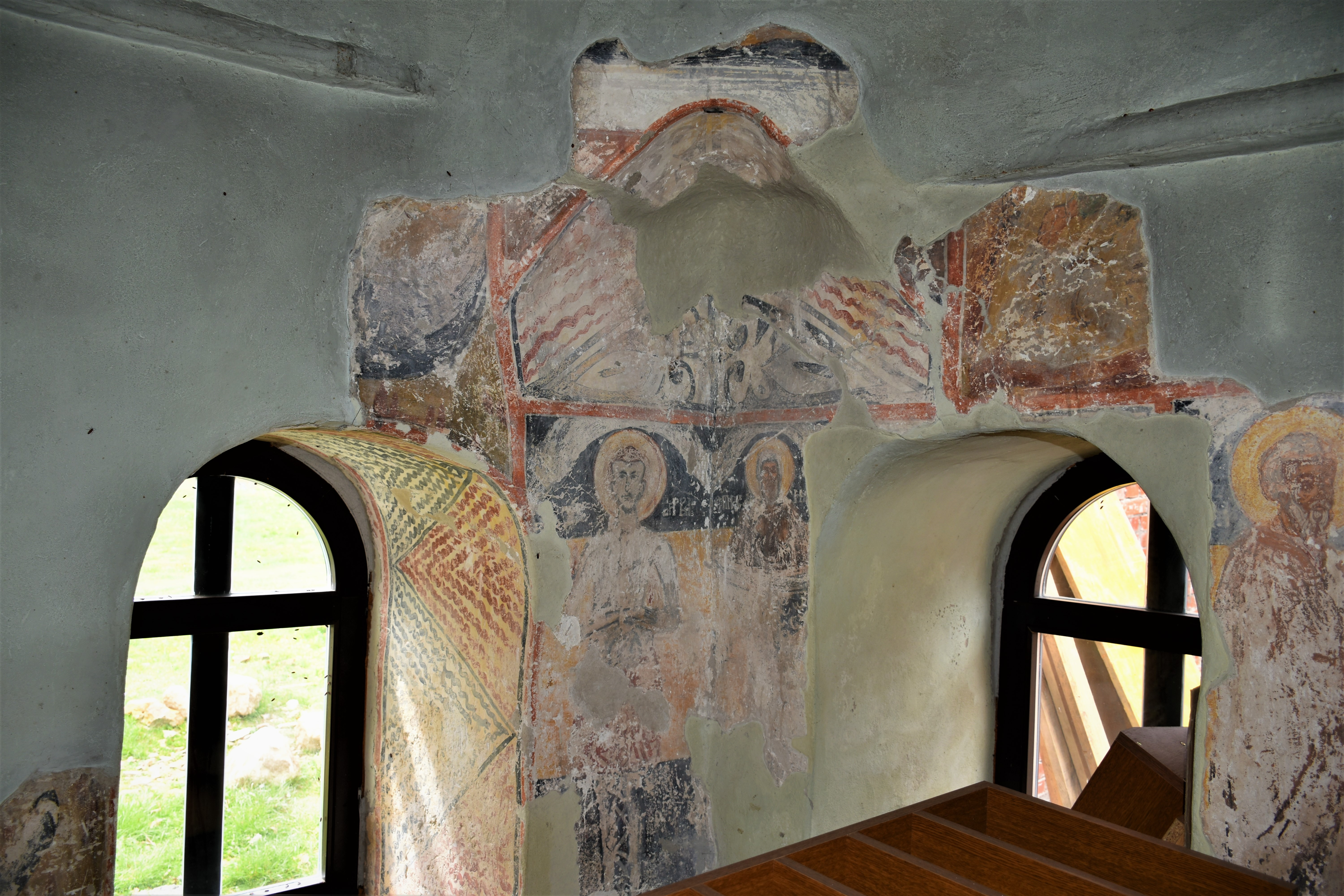
Preserved frescoes

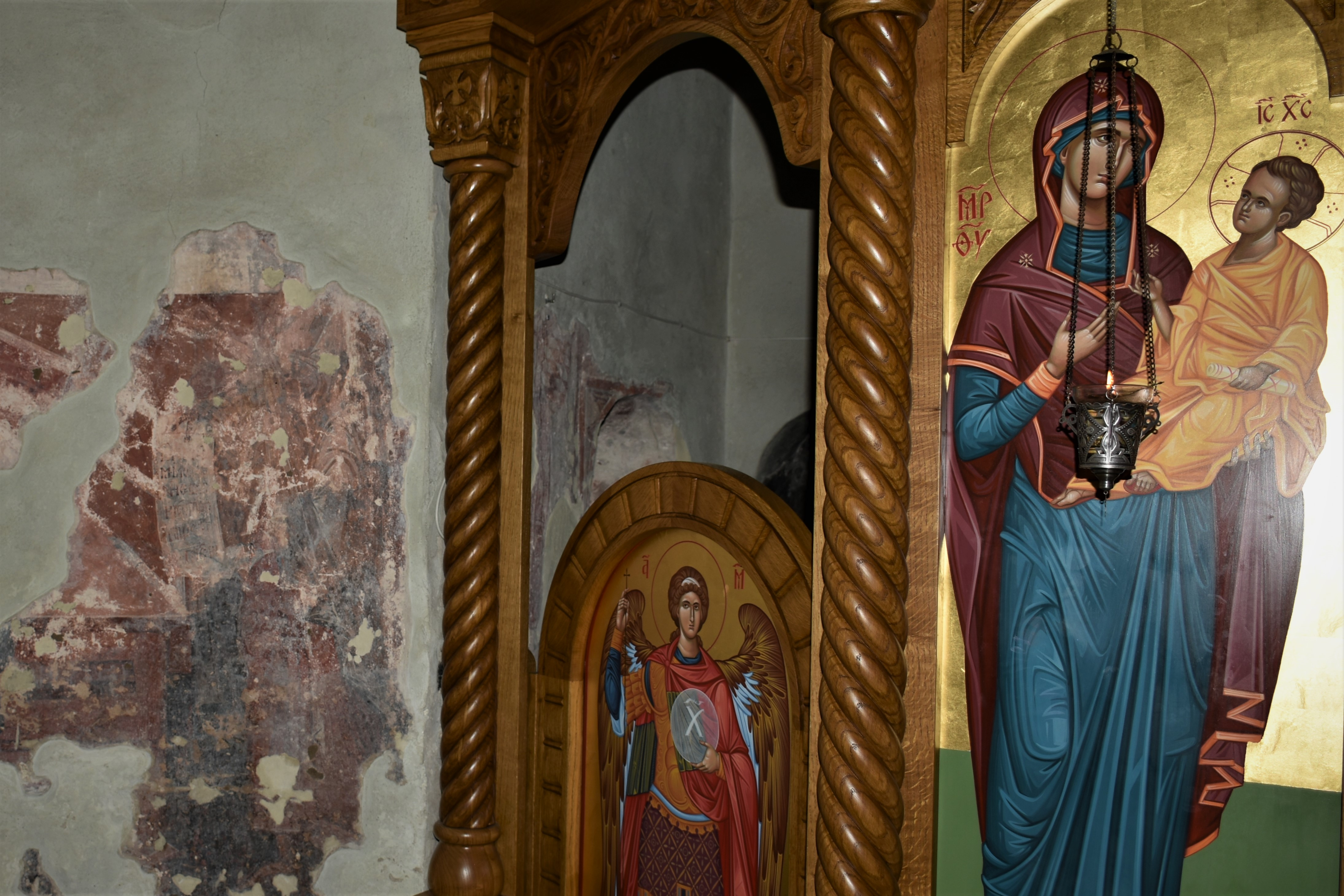
The interior of the Monastery

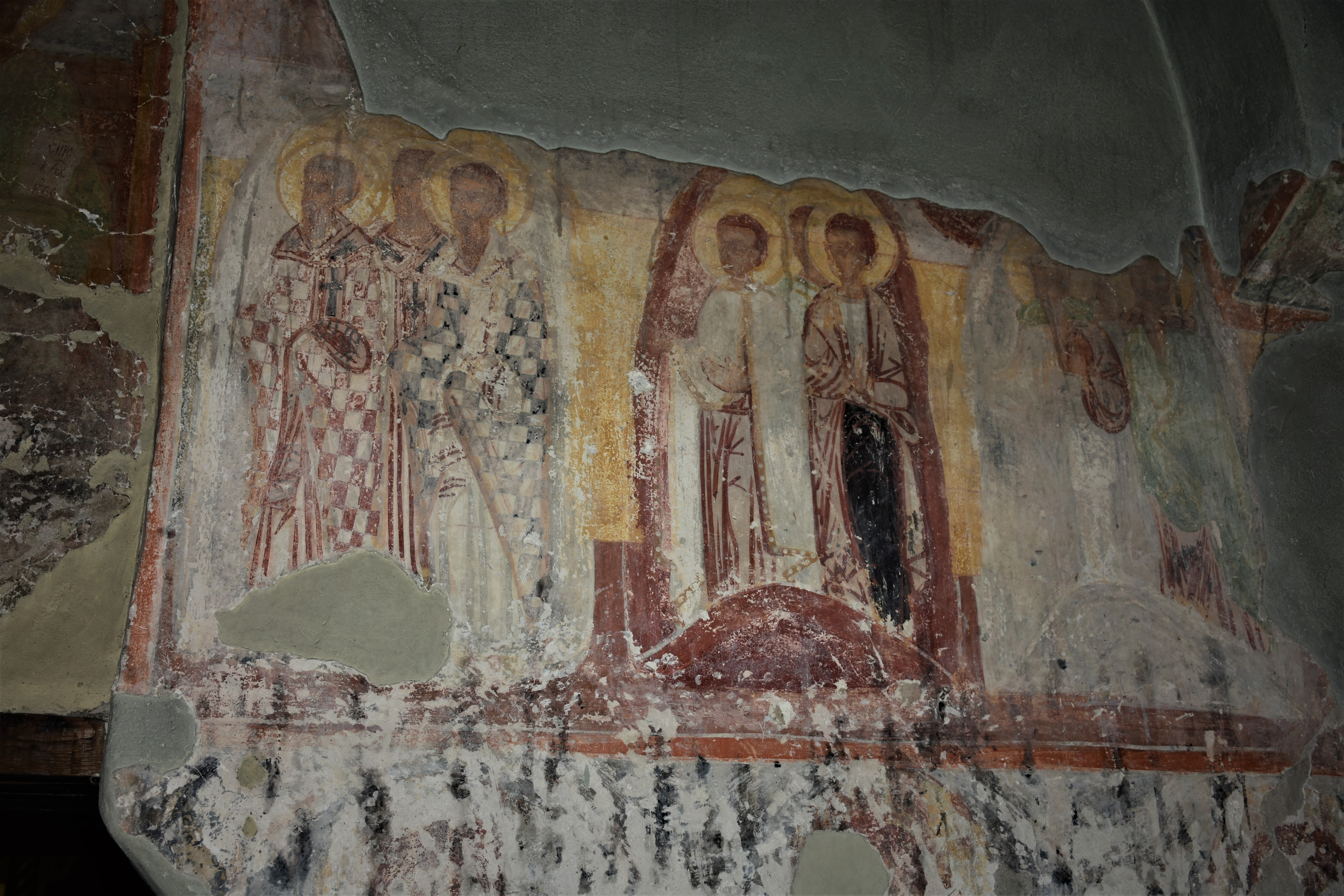
Preserved frescoes
