= Balinac =

Balinac may refer to:

- Balinac (Knjaževac), a village in Serbia
- Balinac, Croatia, a village near Glina, Croatia
