= Vrav =

Settlement in Bulgaria

Vrav Връв Vârf
- Village
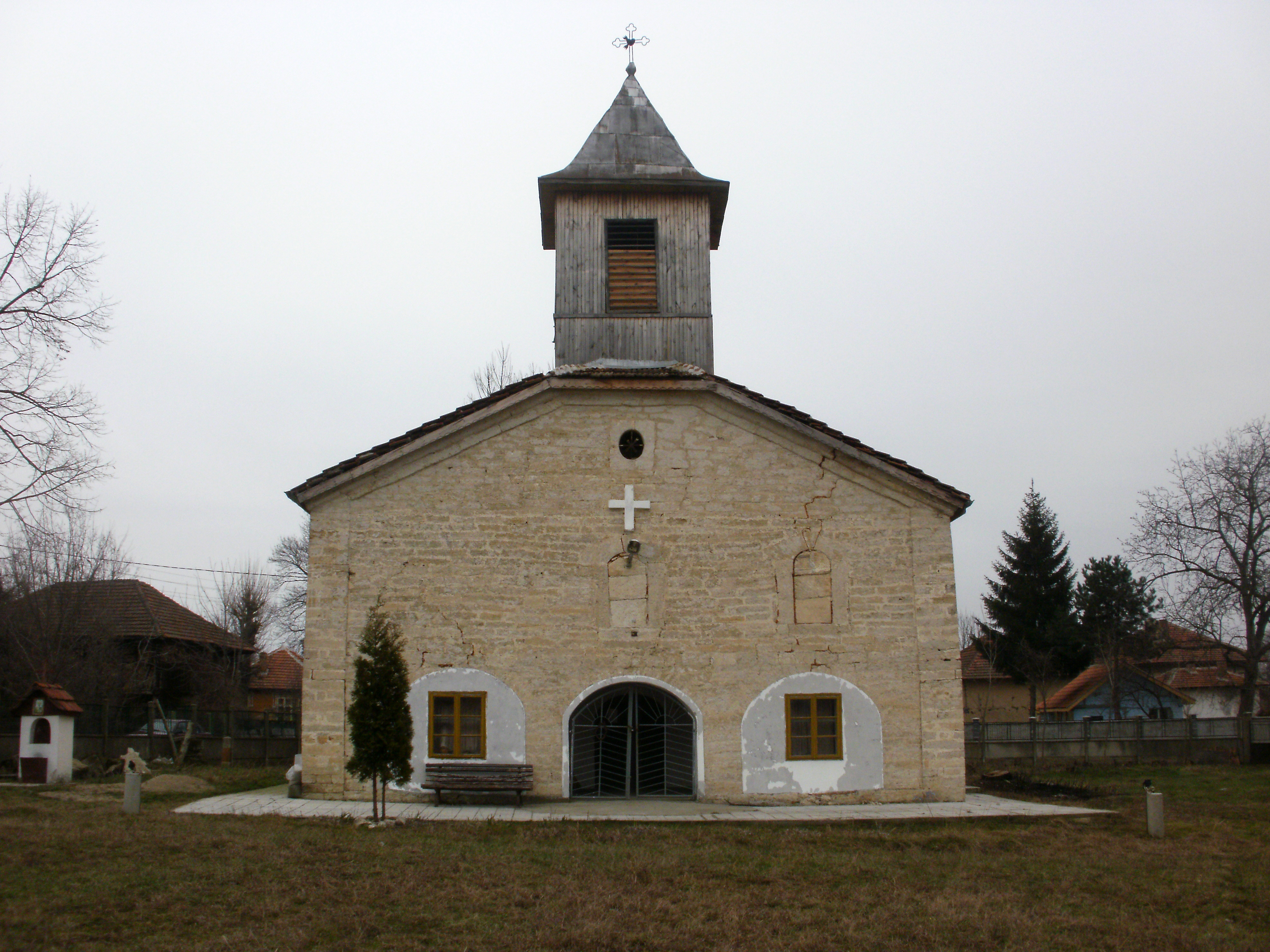
- The Church of St. Nicholas in Vrav
- Interactive map of Vrav
- Location of Vrav
- Coordinates: 44°11′N 22°44′E
- Country: Bulgaria
- Provinces (Oblast): Vidin

Government
  - Mayor representative: Valentina Ivanova
- Elevation: 42 m (138 ft)

Population (2008)
  - Total: 257
- Time zone: UTC+2 (EET)
  - Summer (DST): UTC+3 (EEST)
- Postal Code: 3779
- Area code: 09344

Vrav (Bulgarian: Връв [ˈvrəf]; also Vrǎv or Vruv; Romanian: Vârf) is a village in northwestern Bulgaria, part of Bregovo municipality, Vidin Province. Located on the right bank of the Danube at the place where the Timok River empties into it, Vrav is the northernmost populated place in Bulgaria and the first Bulgarian port along the Danube's course. The village has a Romanian (commonly referred to as "Vlach" in Bulgaria) population and lies 30 kilometres from the provincial capital Vidin and 12 kilometres from Bregovo (the municipal center).

As of 2022, the village has a population of 257. The mayor respresentative (appointed by Bregovo mayor) is Valentina Ivanova. Vrav is situated at 44°11′N 22°44′E, at an elevation of 42 metres above mean sea level.

Vrav lies opposite the Romanian village Gârla Mare in Mehedinți County, to which the residents of Vrav are related through kinship ties. The area is known for its characteristic horo dance. The locals are part of the ethnographic group of the "wet Vlachs" (мокри власи, mokri vlasi), known as such because they live at the confluence of the Timok and the Danube, to contrast them with the "bushy Vlachs" (рунтави власи, runtavi vlasi) of the mountains to the southwest along the Serbian border. "Vlach" is the name native Romanians in Bulgaria commonly receive. The population is Eastern Orthodox and speaks an old Romanian dialect alongside Bulgarian. According to some researchers, the Romanians came to those areas in the 18th century. They declare themselves to be Bulgarians, however, as the 2001 census recorded only 155 "Vlachs" and 16 Romanians in the entire Vidin Province.

== History ==
The ancient Roman fort of Dorticum was built probably in the 1st c. AD and is located about 1 km west of the village of Vrav. It was part of the Limes Moesiae frontier defense along the Danube, part of the Danubian limes. The fort's longer walls were along the river, unlike the typical Roman forts to the east along the river. The Roman vicus grew up to the west of the fort.

Vrav already existed in the early 18th century, as it was marked on Luigi Ferdinando Marsigli's map of the area of 1711. According to semi-legendary evidence, the village was founded by seven refugee families from the Banat, with the remainder of the population coming from the surrounding Romanian villages in Serbia and Romania. Its old name was Kosheritse, but as the locals moved it to a hilltop, they changed the name accordingly. In 1900, the village had a population of 1,974 and in 1926: 2,178.
