= Kosovo, Vidin Province =

Village in northwestern Bulgaria

Kosovo (Bulgarian: Косово; Romanian: Cosova) is a village in Bregovo Municipality, Vidin Province, Northwestern Bulgaria, located at 44°5′53″N 22°38′0″E.
