= Bregovo Municipality =

Bregovo Municipality Община Брегово
- Municipality
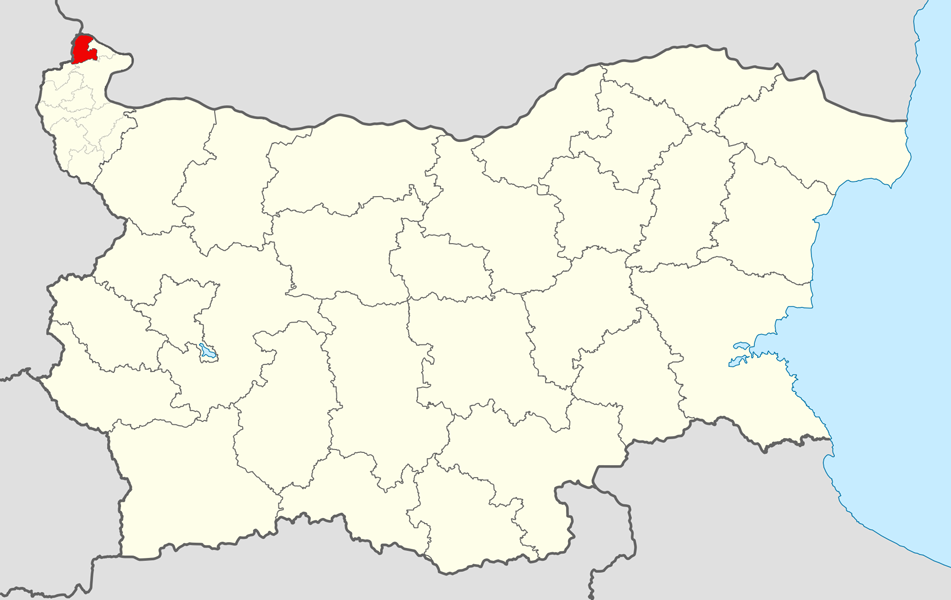
- Bregovo Municipality within Bulgaria and Vidin Province.
- Coordinates: 44°8′N 22°39′E
- Country: Bulgaria
- Province (Oblast): Vidin
- Admin. centre (Obshtinski tsentar): Bregovo

Area
  - Total: 180 km^{2} (69 sq mi)

Population (December 2009)
  - Total: 6,168
  - Density: 34/km^{2} (89/sq mi)
- Time zone: UTC+2 (EET)
  - Summer (DST): UTC+3 (EEST)

Bregovo Municipality (Bulgarian: Община Брегово) is a frontier municipality (obshtina) in Vidin Province, Northwestern Bulgaria, located along the right bank of Danube river in the Danubian Plain. It is named after its administrative centre - the town of Bregovo. The area borders on the Republic of Serbia to the west and Romania beyond the Danube to the north and it is the most northwestern part of the country.

The municipality covers a territory of 180 km^{2} (69 sq mi) with a population of 6,168 inhabitants, as of December 2009.

== Settlements ==
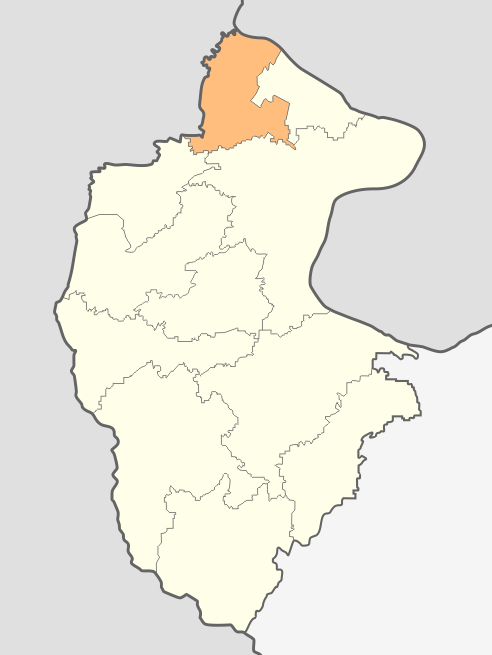
Bregovo Municipality within Vidin Province

Bregovo Municipality includes the following 10 places (towns are shown in bold):

Town/Village	Cyrillic	Population (December 2009)
**Bregovo**	**Брегово**	2,592
Baley	Балей	453
Deleyna	Делейна	364
Gamzovo	Гъмзово	768
Kalina	Калина	38
Kosovo	Косово	452
Kudelin	Куделин	411
Rakitnitsa	Ракитница	480
Tiyanovtsi	Тияновци	171
Vrav	Връв	439
Total		6,168

== Demography ==
The following table shows the change of the population during the last four decades.

Bregovo Municipality
**Year**	1975	1985	1992	**2001**	2005	2007	2009	**2011**
**Population**	12,144	10,243	9,231	7,515	6,725	6,539	6,168	5,514
Sources: Census 2001, Census 2011, „pop-stat.mashke.org“,

=== Ethnic composition ===
According to the 2011 census, among those who answered the optional question on ethnic identification, the ethnic composition of the municipality was the following:

Ethnic group	Population	Percentage
Bulgarians	5147	95.4%
Turks	0	0%
Roma (Gypsy)	152	2.8%
Other	66	1.2%
Undeclared	32	0.6%

==== Religion ====
According to the latest Bulgarian census of 2011, the religious composition, among those who answered the optional question on religious identification, was the following:

Religious composition of Bregovo Municipality
Orthodox Christianity	83.9%
Catholicism	0.2%
Protestantism	0.1%
Islam	0.0%
No religion	6.1%
Prefer not to answer, others and indefinable	9.7%

An overwhelming majority of the population of Bregovo Municipality identify themselves as Christians. At the 2011 census, 83.9% of respondents identified as Orthodox Christians belonging to the Bulgarian Orthodox Church.

== See also ==
- Provinces of Bulgaria
- Municipalities of Bulgaria
- List of cities and towns in Bulgaria
