= Bregovo =

Bregovo Брегово
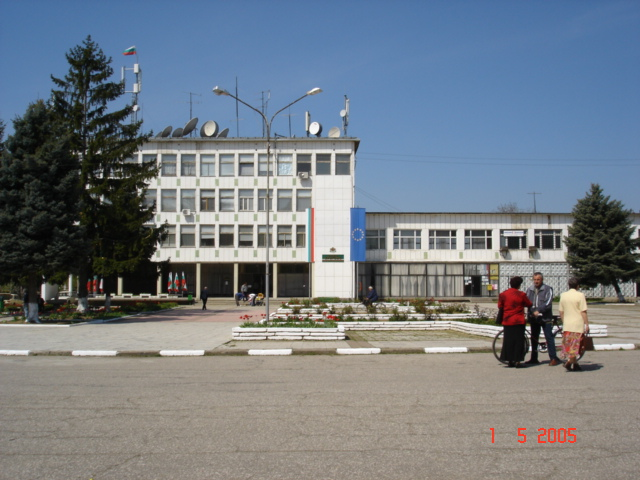
- Bregovo
- Interactive map of Bregovo
- Location of Bregovo
- Coordinates: 44°9′N 22°39′E
- Country: Bulgaria
- Provinces (Oblast): Vidin

Government
  - Mayor: Ilyan Barsanov
- Elevation: 56 m (184 ft)

Population (2020)
  - Total: 2,312
- Time zone: UTC+2 (EET)
  - Summer (DST): UTC+3 (EEST)
- Postal Code: 3790
- Area code: 09312

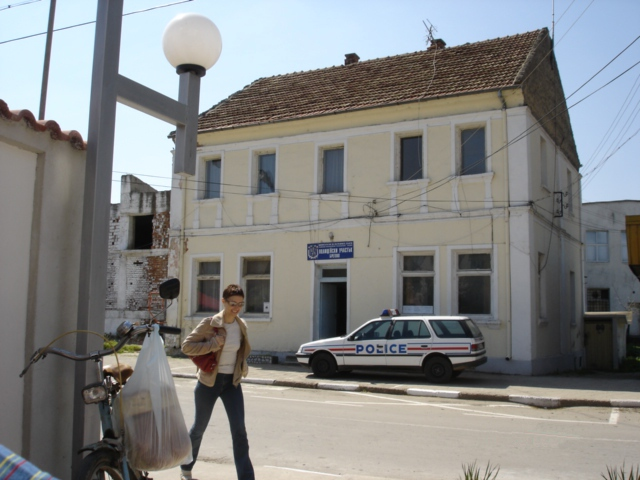
Bregovo's police station

Bregovo (Bulgarian: Брегово [ˈbrɛɡovo]; Romanian: Bregova) is a town in the very northwest of Bulgaria, situated on the east bank of the Timok River close to its mouth. It is the administrative centre of the homonymous Bregovo Municipality, Vidin Province. The town is located close to the city of Vidin near the national border crossings with Serbia and Romania. As of December 2009, the town had a population of 2,592.

The name of the town was first attested in writing in 1560 in an Ottoman register. It is derived from breg, meaning "shore" (in this case, the Timok shore), while -ovo is a common Slavic suffix indicating a placename. A secular school was built in 1864, a post office followed in 1879, and a custom house emerged in Bregovo in 1895. A community centre (chitalishte) was in its turn opened on 26 December 1897.
