= Borovac (Zaječar) =

Borovac Боровац
- Village
- Location within Serbia
- Coordinates: 43°44′11″N 22°17′41″E
- Country: Serbia
- District: Zaječar District
- Municipality: Zaječar

Population (2002)
  - Total: 167
- Time zone: UTC+1 (CET)
  - Summer (DST): UTC+2 (CEST)

Borovac is a village in the municipality of Zaječar, Serbia. According to the 2002 census, the village has a population of 167.
