= Donje Zuniče =

- Village
- Location within Serbia
- Coordinates: 43°37′22″N 22°16′37″E
- Country: Serbia
- District: Zaječar District
- Municipality: Knjaževac

Population (2002)
  - Total: 407
- Time zone: UTC+1 (CET)
  - Summer (DST): UTC+2 (CEST)

Donje Zuniče is a village in the municipality of Knjaževac, Serbia. According to the 2002 census, the village has a population of 407 people.
