= Timok Valley =

Geographical region in Serbia

Coordinates: 44°00′N 22°10′E

Timok Valley Тимочка Крајина Timočka Krajina
- Historical and geographical region of Serbia
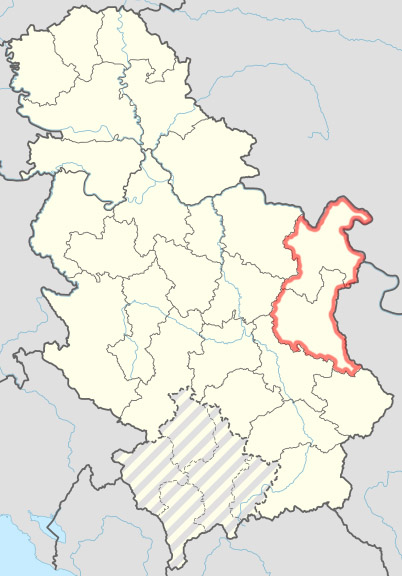
- Country: Serbia
- Largest city: Zaječar

Population
  - Total: c. 200,000

The Timok Valley (Serbian: Тимочка Крајина, lit. 'Timok Frontier'; Romanian: Valea Timocului) is a geographical region in eastern Serbia around the Timok River. It roughly corresponds to two administrative districts, Bor and Zaječar, which have a combined population of 197,815.

== Etymology ==
The Serbian name is derived from the hydronym Timok and krajina ("frontier, march"), named such due to its location and history as a borderland. The term was in use in the 19th century. In 1876, Timočka Krajina was described as including the okrug of Aleksinac, Gurgusovac, Crna Reka and Krajina. It was introduced officially in the interwar period as denoting the Timok confluence with the Negotinska Krajina and Ključ, and is noted as having no historical or geographical basis. The Timok Oblast (Тимочка област), which existed between 1922 and 1929, was also known as Timočka Krajina.

In Romanian, the term "Timoc Valley" (Valea Timocului) is used for the area inhabited by the Romanian-speaking Vlachs. The region was sometimes known as Podunavia (Podunavlje) in medieval times.

== History ==
Early Bronze Age pottery of the Kostolac-Kocofeni culture has been found throughout the region. During the Roman era, the area was administratively part of the Dacia Ripensis. During emperor Justinian's reign there were numerous fortifications in the area. Notable Roman sites include Timacum Minus, Trajan's Bridge, Diana Fortress, and others. The Bulgarian ruler Ivan Stratsimir (Vidin Principate) and Wallachian Voivode Mircea the Elder controlled the territory of Podunavia (the Timok Valley) until the Ottoman conquest in the 14th century. Several settlements in the region received Habsburg monarchy frontier status after the 1718 Treaty of Passarowitz; the area became a frontier towards the Ottoman Empire.

The area was a battleground between Serbian rebels and the Ottoman Empire during the First Serbian Uprising (1804–1813).

A peasant uprising took place in 1883, known as the Timok Rebellion, resulting from various economic, political, and social factors.

Between 1918 and 1922, there were two districts of the Kingdom of Serbs, Croats, and Slovenes in the area – Krajina District, with seat in Negotin, and Timok District with seat in Zaječar. In 1922, these two districts were merged into the newly formed Timok Oblast with seat in Zaječar. Timok Oblast existed until 1929 when it was included into the newly formed Morava Banovina with seat in Niš.

During World War II it was an area of operations of the Yugoslav Partisans.

At present there are two administrative districts encompassing the area: Bor District with seat in Bor; and Zaječar District with seat in Zaječar.

== Geography ==
The Timok Valley extends from the Kučaj foothills near Knjaževac to the Vratarnica river. In Socialist Serbia, the region included the towns of Negotin (also belonging to Negotinska Krajina), Knjaževac and Zaječar.

=== Climate ===
Zaječar, the biggest town in the region, has a humid continental climate (Köppen climate classification: Dfa), bordering on a humid subtropical climate (Köppen climate classification: Cfa).

Climate data for Zaječar (1981–2010)
Month	Jan	Feb	Mar	Apr	May	Jun	Jul	Aug	Sep	Oct	Nov	Dec	Year
Mean daily maximum °C (°F)	4.7 (40.5)	7.0 (44.6)	12.1 (53.8)	18.1 (64.6)	23.6 (74.5)	27.3 (81.1)	29.7 (85.5)	29.6 (85.3)	24.4 (75.9)	17.8 (64.0)	10.0 (50.0)	5.1 (41.2)	17.4 (63.3)
Daily mean °C (°F)	−0.2 (31.6)	1.2 (34.2)	5.9 (42.6)	11.4 (52.5)	16.8 (62.2)	20.4 (68.7)	22.4 (72.3)	21.7 (71.1)	16.6 (61.9)	10.8 (51.4)	4.8 (40.6)	0.7 (33.3)	11.0 (51.8)
Mean daily minimum °C (°F)	−4.2 (24.4)	−3.4 (25.9)	0.3 (32.5)	4.7 (40.5)	9.5 (49.1)	12.7 (54.9)	14.2 (57.6)	13.9 (57.0)	9.9 (49.8)	5.4 (41.7)	0.7 (33.3)	−2.9 (26.8)	5.1 (41.2)
Average precipitation mm (inches)	38.4 (1.51)	39.8 (1.57)	40.6 (1.60)	53.2 (2.09)	52.4 (2.06)	58.1 (2.29)	56.3 (2.22)	43.9 (1.73)	44.3 (1.74)	48.0 (1.89)	52.3 (2.06)	54.0 (2.13)	581.4 (22.89)
Average precipitation days (≥ 0.1 mm)	11	10	11	12	12	10	8	7	8	9	11	12	122
Average snowy days	8	7	5	0	0	0	0	0	0	0	3	6	28
Average relative humidity (%)	79	75	71	69	69	68	64	66	71	78	81	82	73
Mean monthly sunshine hours	71.7	92.2	129.3	165.7	223.4	254.1	286.5	266.4	188.0	125.8	72.9	55.9	1,932
Source: Republic Hydrometeorological Service of Serbia

== Demographics ==
=== Towns ===
There are three towns with over 10,000 inhabitants.

- Zaječar: 32,448
- Bor: 28,822
- Negotin: 14,647

=== Ethnic structure ===
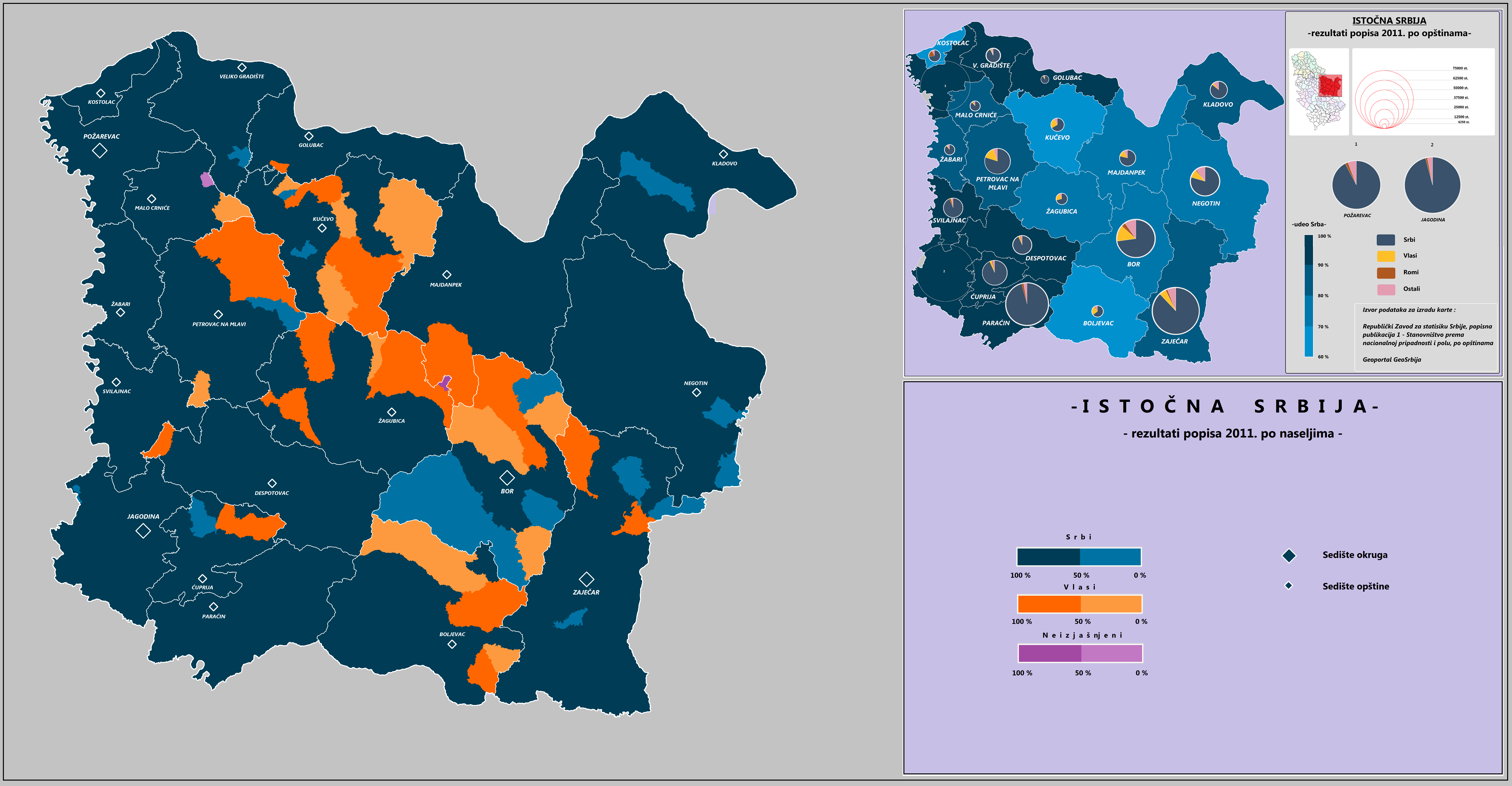
Ethnic map of eastern Serbia by settlements and municipalities, 2011 census

The region is inhabited by a majority of Serbs and minority of Vlachs. The Serb community traditionally speak the Kosovo–Resava dialect in the north and the Prizren-Timok dialect in the south; however, standard Serbian is used in formal communication. The Vlachs speak a variety of two dialects (Banat and Oltenian dialects) of the Romanian language, which awaits standardization into a hypothetical new language for the Vlachs. Both Serbs and Vlachs are Eastern Orthodox by denomination. There is ongoing debate over the ethnic identification of the Vlach community and whether they are Romanians or not.

Ethnicity	Population	Share
Serbs	162,414	82.1%
Vlachs	11,336	5.7%
Roma	3,521	1.7%
Others	5,736	2.9%
Undeclared/Unknown	16,548	8.3%

== Gallery ==
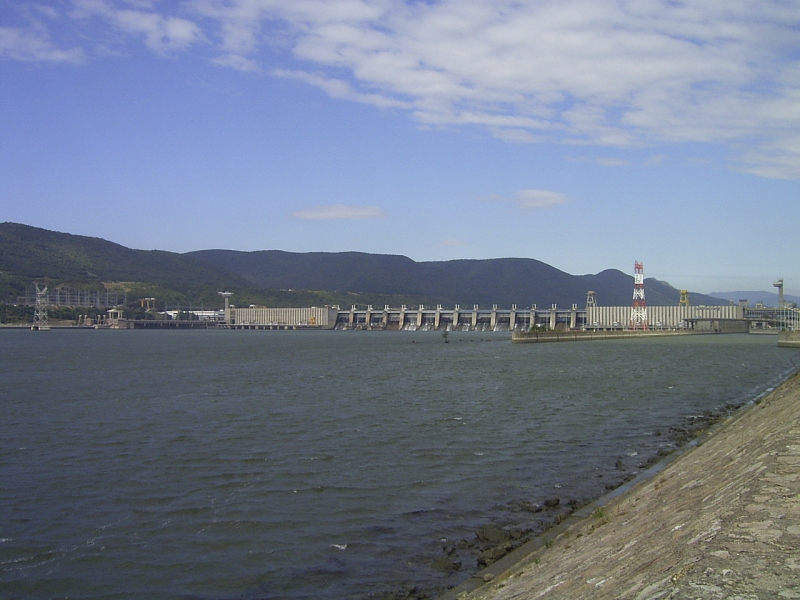
Iron Gate I Hydroelectric Power Station

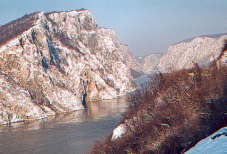
The Kazan Gorge

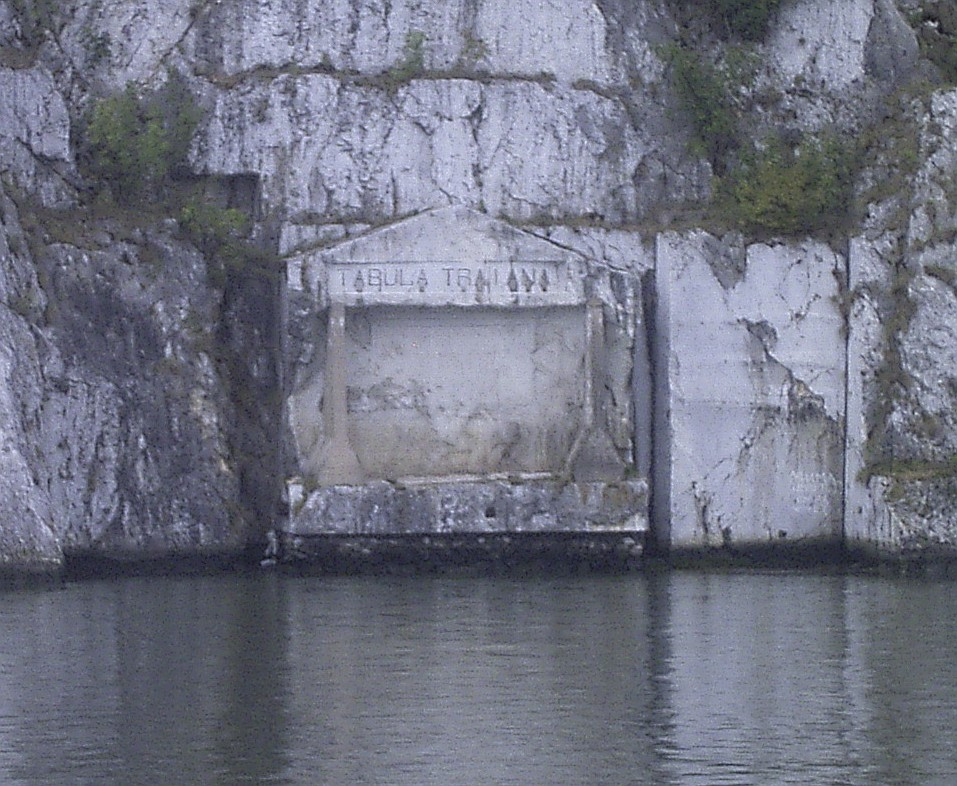
Tabula Traiana

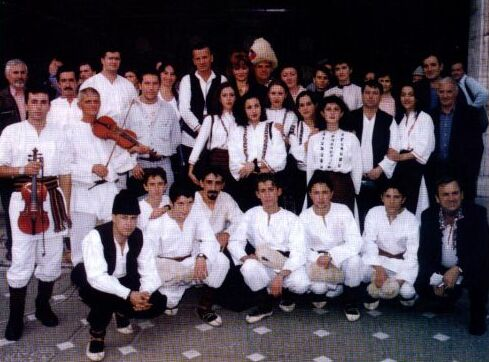
Folkloric group in Vlach traditional costumes from Jabukovac

== See also ==
- List of regions of Serbia

== Sources ==
- Božić, Sofija (2014). Историја и географија: Сусрети и прожимања / History and geography: Meetings and permeations (in Serbian and English). Beograd: Institut za nоviju istоriju Srbije, Geоgrafski institut "Jоvan Cvijić" SАNU, Institut za slavistku Ran. pp. 409–. ISBN 978-86-7005-125-6.
- Jovanović, Dragoljub K. (1883). "Црна река". Glasnik Srpskog učenog društva. 54: 187–256.
- Milićević, M. Đ (1876). "Тимочка Крајина". Kneževina Srbija. Sloboda. pp. 771-.
- Paunović, Marinko (1970). Đerdap i Timočka Krajina. Binoza.
- Radovanović, Olica; Tošić, Snežana (2010). "Characteristics and problems of demographic development of Timočka Krajina in the second half of the 20th century". Zbornik Matice srpske za društvene nauke. 131: 387–395.
- Todorović, Miodrag (2007). "Evolucija stanovništva Timočke krajine 1901–2002". Zbornik radova Instituta za savremenu istoriju. 10: 145–153.
- Vlahović, Petar (2006). Serbia: The Country, People, Life, Customs. Ethnographic Museum. ISBN 978-86-7891-031-9.
- Živković, Ljiljana; Jovanović, Slavoljub (2014). "Territorial-demographic and functional organisation of the Negotinska Krajina settlement net". Историја и географија: Сусрети и прожимања: 407–421. ISBN 9788670051256.
