= Kalna (Knjaževac) =

- Location within Serbia
- Coordinates: 43°24′32″N 22°25′35″E
- Country: Serbia
- Time zone: UTC+1 (CET)
  - Summer (DST): UTC+2 (CEST)

Kalna (Serbian: Кална) is a small village in the Knjaževac municipality of the Zaječar District of Serbia.
