= Trnovac (Knjaževac) =

Coordinates: 43.6794°N 22.2619°E

- Village
- Interactive map of Trnovac
- Country: Serbia
- District: Zaječar District
- Municipality: Knjaževac

Population (2002)
  - Total: 227
- Time zone: UTC+1 (CET)
  - Summer (DST): UTC+2 (CEST)

Trnovac is a village in the municipality of Knjaževac, Serbia. According to the 2002 census, the village has a population of 227 people.More recent estimates indicate a population of 88 as of 2022.
