= Gornja Kamenica =

- Village
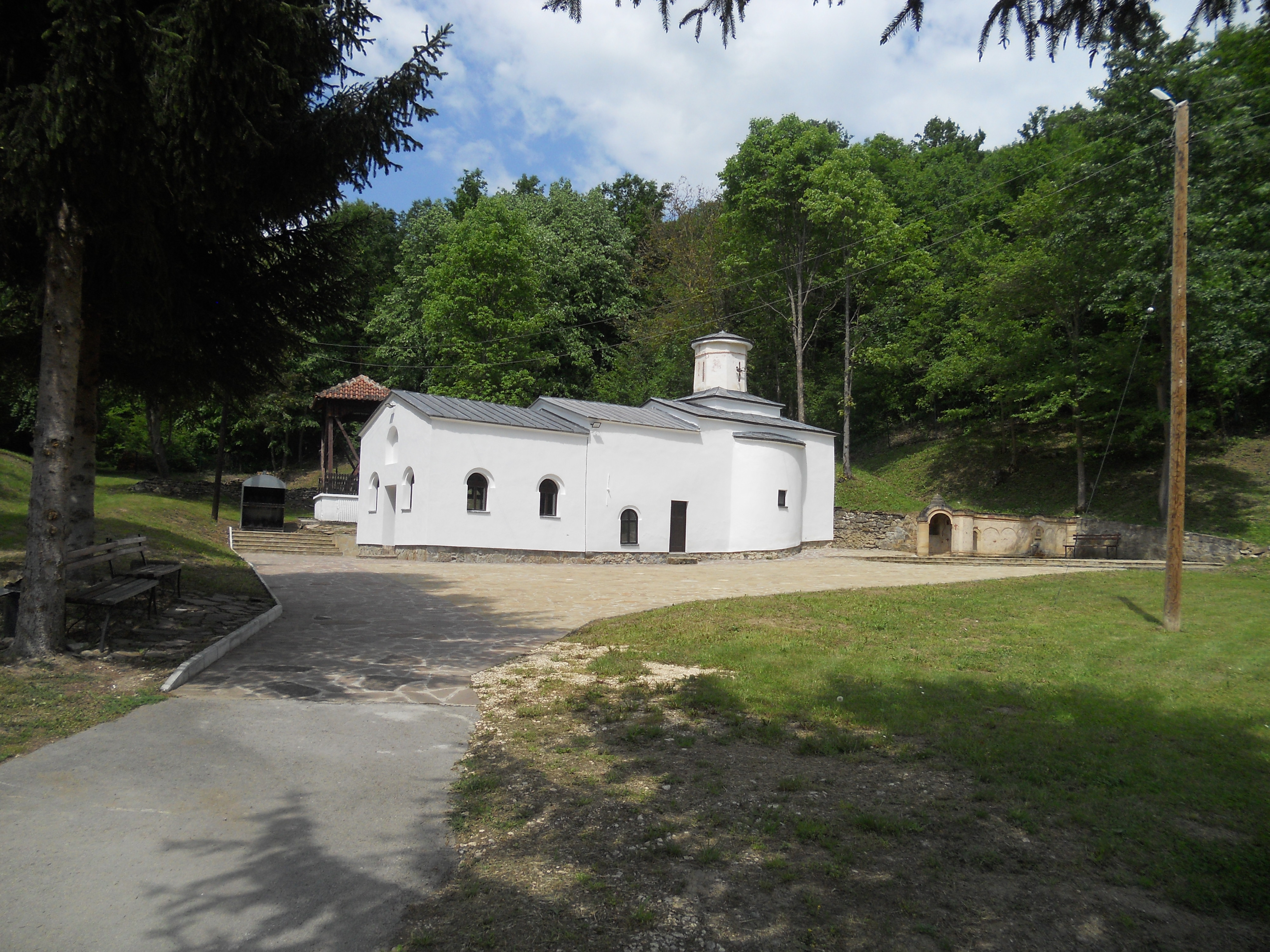

- Location within Serbia
- Coordinates: 43°28′28″N 22°21′21″E
- Country: Serbia
- District: Zaječar District
- Municipality: Knjaževac

Population (2022)
  - Total: 157
- Time zone: UTC+1 (CET)
  - Summer (DST): UTC+2 (CEST)
- Website: http://www.gornjakamenica.rs

Gornja Kamenica is a village in the municipality of Knjaževac, Serbia. According to the 2022 census, the village has a population of 157 people.

Monastery of the Holy Trinity in Gornja Kamenica was founded in 15th century by Despot Lazar, and is protected as a cultural monument of great importance.
