= Năeni =

- Commune
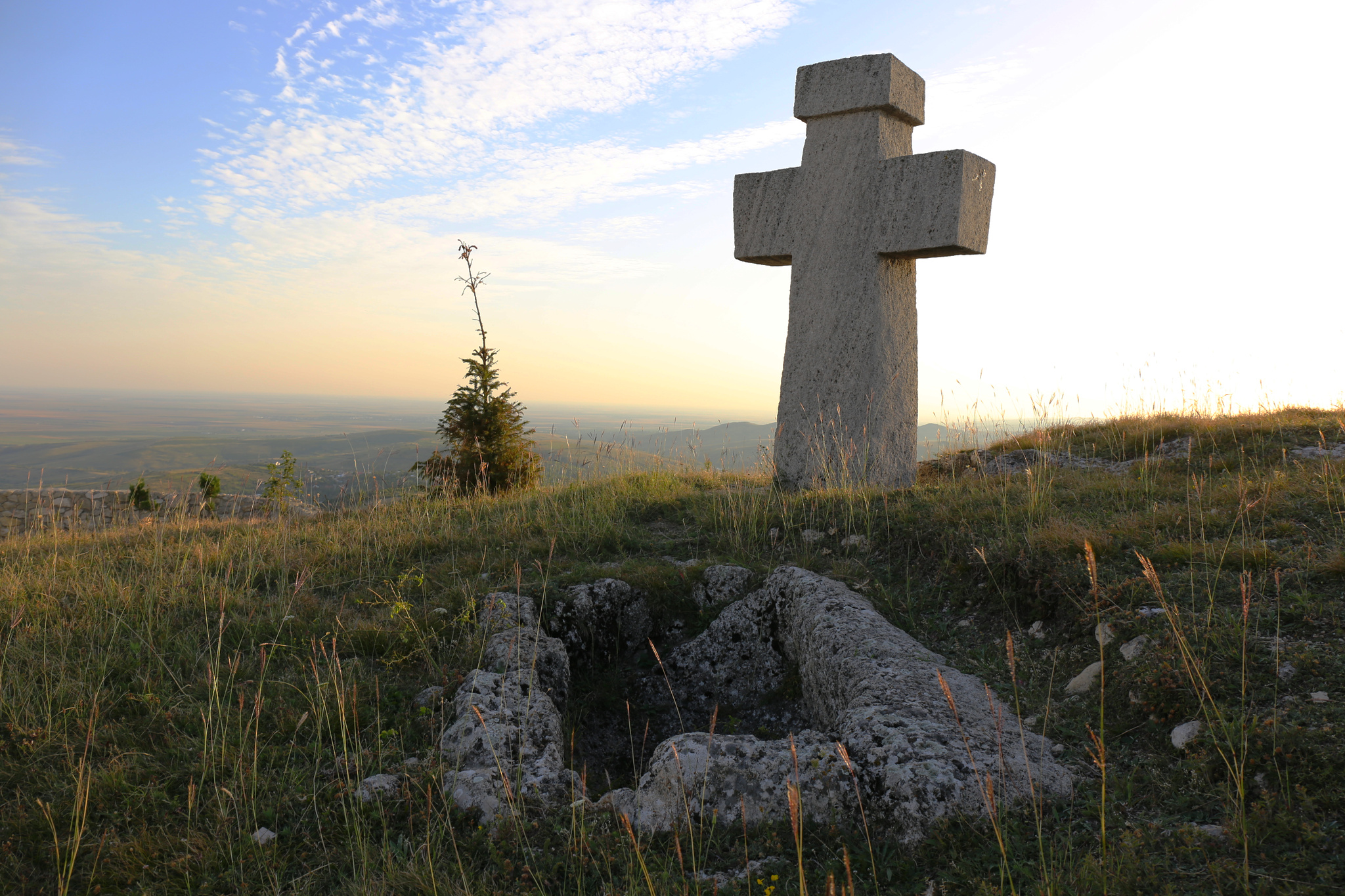
- Necropolis in Proșca

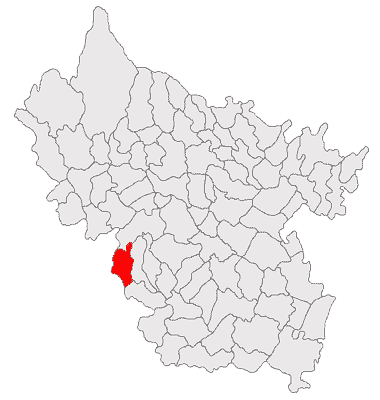
- Location in Buzău County

- Location in Romania
- Coordinates: 45°6′N 26°29′E
- Country: Romania
- County: Buzău
- Subdivisions: Fântânele, Fințești, Năeni, Proșca, Vârf

Government
  - Mayor (2020–2024): Petre-Petrini Burducea (PMP)
- Area: 47 km^{2} (18 sq mi)
- Elevation: 350 m (1,150 ft)
- Highest elevation: 585 m (1,919 ft)
- Lowest elevation: 131 m (430 ft)
- Population (2021-12-01): 1,516
  - Density: 32/km^{2} (84/sq mi)
- Time zone: UTC+02:00 (EET)
  - Summer (DST): UTC+03:00 (EEST)
- Postal code: 127390
- Area code: +(40) 238
- Vehicle reg.: BZ
- Website: primarianaeni.ro

Năeni is a commune in Buzău County, Muntenia, Romania. It is composed of five villages: Fântânele, Fințești, Năeni, Proșca, and Vârf.

Historical population
Year	Pop.	±%
2002	2,047	—
2011	1,805	−11.8%
2021	1,516	−16.0%
Source: Census data

== Natives ==
Ștefan Popescu (1872–1948), painter
