= Balinac (Knjaževac) =

Balinac Балинац
- Village
- Location within Serbia
- Coordinates: 43°33′20″N 22°23′44″E
- Country: Serbia
- District: Zaječar District
- Municipality: Knjaževac

Population (2002)
  - Total: 38
- Time zone: UTC+1 (CET)
  - Summer (DST): UTC+2 (CEST)

Balinac is a village in the municipality of Knjaževac, Serbia. At the 2002 census, the village had a population of 38 people.
