= Timok =

River in Serbia and Bulgaria

Timok Great Timok
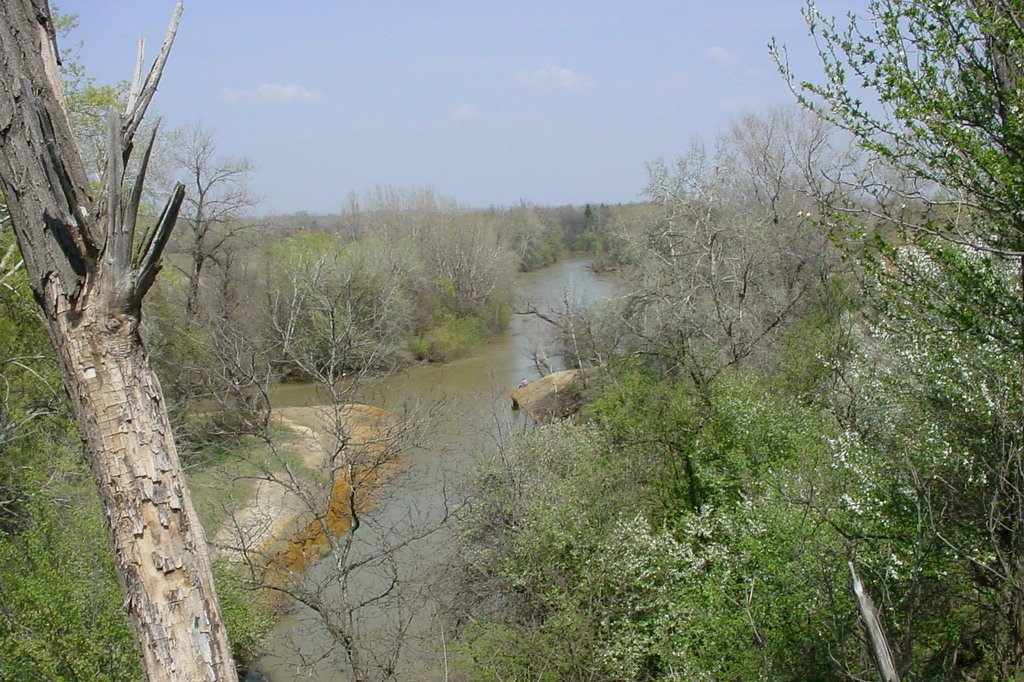
- View of the Timok at Baley, Bulgaria
- Native name: Тимок / Timok (Serbian); Тимок (Bulgarian); Timoc (Romanian)

Location
- Countries: Serbia; Bulgaria
- Towns: Serbia': Zaječar; Brusnik; Bulgaria: Bregovo; Baley

Physical characteristics
- Source: Zaječar, Serbia
  - location: Junction of the Beli Timok and the Crni Timok
  - coordinates: 43°55′12″N 22°17′52″E
- Mouth: Danube
  - location: north of Bregovo, Bulgaria / east of Negotin, Serbia
  - coordinates: 44°12′49″N 22°40′13″E
- Length: 202 km (126 mi)
- Basin size: 4,626 km^{2} (1,786 sq mi)
- Discharge
  - location: mouth
  - average: 31 m^{3}/s (1,100 cu ft/s)

Basin features
- Progression: Danube→ Black Sea
- Tributaries
  - left: Crni Timok
  - right: Beli Timok

The Timok (Serbian and Bulgarian: Тимок, Romanian: Timoc), sometimes also known as Great Timok (Serbian: Велики Тимок / Veliki Timok, Romanian: Timocul Mare), is a river in eastern Serbia, a right tributary of the Danube. For the last 15 km of its run it forms a border between eastern Serbia and western Bulgaria.

It is a branchy system of many shorter rivers, many of them having the same name (Timok), only clarified with adjectives. From the farthest source in the system, that of the Svrljiški Timok, until its confluence (as Veliki Timok), the Timok is 202 km long. The area of the river basin is 4,626 km^{2} (1,786 sq mi). Its average discharge at the mouth is 31 m^{3}/s (1,100 cu ft/s). The Timok Valley is known for the most important Vlach population in Eastern Serbia.

Its name stems from antiquity, in Latin it was known as Timacus and in Ancient Greek Timachos, Τίμαχος.

This in turn comes from Proto-Indo-European *tm̥Hes-, zero-grade of *témHes-, *témHos- (“darkness”), an s-stem from the root *temH- (“dark”), also present in the names of the Thames and Tamiš/Temes/Timiș, possibly with extension "-q" for water (present in Latin "aqua").

== Drainage system ==
The Timok, also named Veliki Timok to distinguish it from its tributaries, is formed by the confluence of the rivers Beli Timok ("White Timok") and Crni Timok ("Black Timok") at Zaječar. The Beli Timok is formed by the confluence of the rivers Svrljiški Timok ("Svrljig Timok") and Trgoviški Timok ("Trgovište Timok") at Knjaževac.

Tributaries of the Timok are Duboki Dol, Beslarica, Golami Dol, Kijevska, Bračevicka, Studena Voda, Pivnica and Eleshchev from the right, and Lipovička River, Crna reka, Jelašnička reka, Salaška reka, Ogašu Taba, Brusnički potok, Urovički potok, Plandište, and Sikolska river from the left.

== Course ==
The Timok turns north-west after its formation at Zaječar, running next to the villages of Vražogrnac, Trnavac, Čokonjar, and Brusnik. Passing between the last two it leaves the Timok Valley and enters the Negotin Valley.

In the lower course the Timok has no major settlements on the Serbian side (though flowing only 7 km from Negotin). Some 15 km before it empties into the Danube as its right tributary, the Timok becomes a border river, passing next to the Bulgarian town of Bregovo and the Bulgarian village of Baley. The river's mouth represents the northernmost point of Bulgaria, and is only 28 m above sea level, which makes it the lowest point of Serbia. The average discharge is 24 m^{3}/s, but it can grow to 40 m^{3}/s, and the Timok is part of the Black Sea drainage basin. The main (right) tributaries in this section are Crna reka, Salaška reka, Sikolska reka and Čubarska reka (Cyrillic: Црна река, Салашка река, Сиколска река and Чубарска река).

== Cultural Impact ==
Apart from the Timok Valley, the Timok gave its name to the two tribes who lived on its banks, Thracian or Thraco-Celtic Timachi in the I to III century common era, and Slavonic Timočani in the VI to IX and to a rebellion against Serbian king Milan Obrenović IV in 1883, known as the Timok Rebellion.

== Economy and ecology ==
At Čokonjar, the Sokolovica power plant was constructed in 1947–1951. Opportunities for higher electricity production are not used.

The river has been greatly ecologically damaged in recent years by the mining and heavy metal industry in Bor and Krivelj and is consequently polluting the Danube with lead, copper and cadmium.

The river valley is a natural route for the road and railway Niš - Prahovo.

== See also ==
- Rivers in Serbia
- Rivers in Bulgaria
